Bereshit, Bereishit, Bereshis, Bereishis, or B'reshith (—Hebrew for "in beginning" or "in the beginning," the first word in the parashah) is the first weekly Torah portion (parashah) in the annual Jewish cycle of Torah reading.

In the parashah, God creates the heavens, the world, Adam and Eve, and Sabbath. A serpent convinces Eve, who then invites Adam, to eat the fruit of the tree of the knowledge of good and evil, which God had forbidden to them. God curses them and expels them from the Garden of Eden. One of their sons, Cain, becomes the first murderer, killing his brother Abel out of jealousy. Adam and Eve have other children, whose descendants populate the Earth. Each generation becomes more and more degenerate until God decides to destroy humanity. Only one person, Noah, finds God's favor.

The parashah is made up of 7,235 Hebrew letters, 1,931 Hebrew words, 146 verses, and 241 lines in a Torah Scroll (Sefer Torah). Jews read it on the first Sabbath after Simchat Torah, generally in October, or rarely, in late September or early November. Jews also read the beginning part of the parashah, as the second Torah reading for Simchat Torah, after reading the last parts of the Book of Deuteronomy, Parashah V'Zot HaBerachah, .

Readings
In a Masoretic Text of the Tanakh (Hebrew Bible), Parashat Bereishit has ten "open portion" (petuchah) divisions (roughly equivalent to paragraphs, often abbreviated with the Hebrew letter  (peh)). Parashat Bereishit has several further subdivisions, called "closed portion" (setumah) divisions (abbreviated with the Hebrew letter  (samekh)) within the open portion divisions. The first seven open portion divisions set apart the accounts of the first seven days in the first reading. The eighth open portion spans the second and third readings. The ninth open portion contains the fourth, fifth, sixth, and part of the seventh readings. The tenth open portion is identical with the concluding maftir reading. Closed portion divisions further divide the third, fourth, sixth, and seventh readings.

First reading—Genesis 1:1–2:3

The first reading reports God's creation of the heaven and earth. The earth was unformed and void, darkness was over the surface of the deep, and the Spirit of God moved on the face of the water. (Genesis 1:1, Genesis 1:2.) God spoke and created, in six days:
Day one: God spoke light into existence and separated light from darkness. The first open portion ends here. (Genesis 1:3, Genesis 1:4, Genesis 1:5.)
Second day: God created a firmament in the midst of the waters and separated the waters from the firmament. The second open portion ends here.
Third day: God gathered the water below the sky, creating land and sea, and God caused vegetation to sprout from the land. The third open portion ends here.
Fourth day: God set lights in the sky to separate days and years, creating the sun, the moon, and the stars. The fourth open portion ends here.
Fifth day: God had the waters bring forth living creatures in sea along with the birds of the air and blessed them to be fruitful and multiply. The fifth open portion ends here.
Sixth day: God had the earth bring forth living creatures from the land, and made humankind in God's image, male and female, giving them dominion over the animals and the earth, and blessed them to be fruitful and multiply. God gave vegetation to them and the animals for food and declared all creation "very good." The sixth open portion ends here with the end of chapter .
Seventh day: God ceased work and blessed the seventh day, declaring it holy. The first reading and the seventh open portion end here.

Second reading—Genesis 2:4–19

In the second reading, before any shrub or grass had yet sprouted on earth, and before God had sent rain for the earth, a flow would well up from the ground to water the earth. God formed man from the dust, blew the breath of life into his nostrils, and made him a living being. God planted a garden in the east in Eden, caused to grow there every good and pleasing tree, and placed the tree of life and the Tree of the knowledge of good and evil in the middle of the garden. A river issued from Eden to water the garden, and then divided into four branches: the Pishon, which winds through Havilah, where the gold is; the Gihon, which winds through Cush; the Tigris, which flows east of Asshur; and the Euphrates. God placed the man in the garden of Eden to till and tend it, and freed him to eat from every tree of the garden, except for the tree of knowledge of good and evil, warning that if the man ate of it, he would surely die. Announcing that it was not good for man to be alone and that God would make for him a fitting helper, God formed out of the earth all the beasts and birds and brought them to the man to name. The second reading ends here.

Third reading—Genesis 2:20–3:21

In the third reading, the man Adam named all the animals, but found no fitting helper. So God cast a deep sleep upon the man and took one of his sides and fashioned it into a woman and brought her to the man. The man declared her bone of his bones and flesh of his flesh, and called her woman. Thus a man leaves his parents and clings to his wife, so that they become one flesh. The man and the woman were naked, but felt no shame. The serpent (nachash), the shrewdest of the beasts, asked the woman whether God had really forbidden her to eat any of the fruit in the garden. The woman replied that they could eat any fruit other than that of the tree in the middle of the garden, which God had warned them neither to eat nor to touch, on pain of death.
The serpent told the woman that she would not die, but that as soon as she ate the fruit, her eyes would be opened and she would be like divine beings who knew good and evil. When the woman saw that the tree was good for food, pleasing in appearance, and desirable as a source of wisdom, she ate some of its fruit and gave some to her husband to eat. Then their eyes were opened and they saw that they were naked; and they sewed themselves loincloths out of fig leaves. Hearing God move in the garden, they hid in the trees. God asked the man where he was. The man replied that he grew afraid when he heard God, and he hid because he was naked. God asked him who told him that he was naked and whether he had eaten the forbidden fruit. The man replied that the woman whom God put at his side gave him the fruit, and he ate. When God asked the woman what she had done, she replied that the serpent duped her, and she ate. God cursed the serpent to crawl on its belly, to eat dirt, and to live in enmity with the woman and her offspring. A closed portion ends here.

In the continuation of the reading, God cursed the woman to bear children in pain, to desire her husband, and to be ruled by him. A closed portion ends here.

In the continuation of the reading, God cursed Adam to toil to earn his food from the ground, which would sprout thorns and thistles, until he returned to the ground from which he was taken. Adam named his wife Eve, because she was the mother to all. And God made skin garments to clothe Adam and Eve. The third reading and the eighth open portion end here.

Fourth reading—Genesis 3:22–4:18
In the fourth reading, remarking that the man had become like God, knowing good and bad, God became concerned that man should also eat from the tree of life and live forever, so God banished him from the garden of Eden, to till the soil. God drove the man out, and stationed cherubim and a fiery ever-turning sword east of the garden to guard the tree of life. A closed portion ends here with the end of chapter .

In the continuation of the reading in chapter , Eve bore Cain and Abel, who became a farmer and a shepherd respectively. Cain brought God an offering from the fruit of the soil, and Abel brought the choicest of the firstlings of his flock. God paid heed to Abel and his offering, but not to Cain and his, distressing Cain. God asked Cain why he was distressed, because he had free will, and if he acted righteously, he would be happy, but if he did not, sin crouched at the door. Cain spoke to Abel, and when they were in the field, Cain killed Abel. When God asked Cain where his brother was, Cain replied that he did not know, asking if he was his brother's keeper. God asked Cain what he had done, as his brother's blood cried out to God from the ground. God cursed Cain to fail at farming and to become a ceaseless wanderer. Cain complained to God that his punishment was too great to bear, as anyone who met him might kill him. So God put a mark on Cain and promised to take sevenfold vengeance on anyone who would kill him. Cain left God's presence and settled in the land of Nod, east of Eden. Cain had a son, Enoch, and founded a city, and named it after Enoch. Enoch had a son Irad; and Irad had a son Mehujael; and Mehujael had a son Methushael; and Methushael had a son Lamech. The fourth reading ends here.

Fifth reading—Genesis 4:19–22
In the short fifth reading, Lamech took two wives: Adah and Zillah. Adah bore Jabal, the ancestor of those who dwell in tents and amidst herds, and Jubal, the ancestor of all who play the lyre and the pipe. And Zillah bore Tubal-cain, who forged implements of copper and iron. The sister of Tubal-cain was Naamah. The fifth reading ends here.

Sixth reading—Genesis 4:23–5:24
In the sixth reading, Lamech told his wives that he had slain a young man for bruising him, and that if Cain was avenged sevenfold, then Lamech should be avenged seventy-sevenfold. Adam and Eve had a third son and named him Seth, meaning "God has provided me with another offspring in place of Abel." Seth had a son named Enosh, and then men began to invoke the Lord by name. A closed portion ends here with the end of chapter .

In the continuation of the reading in chapter , after the birth of Seth, Adam had more sons and daughters, and lived a total of 930 years before he died. A closed portion ends here.

In the continuation of the reading, Adam's descendants and their lifespans were: Seth, 912 years; Enosh, 905 years; Kenan, 910 years; Mahalalel, 895 years; and Jared, 962 years. A closed portion ends after the account of each descendant.

In the continuation of the reading, Jared's son Enoch had a son Methuselah and then walked with God 300 years, and when Enoch reached age 365, God took him. The sixth reading and a closed portion end here.

Seventh reading—Genesis 5:25–6:8

In the seventh reading, Methuselah had a son Lamech and lived 969 years. A closed portion ends here.

In the continuation of the reading, Lamech had a son Noah, saying that Noah would provide relief from their work and toil on the soil that God had cursed. Lamech lived 777 years. A closed portion ends here.

In the continuation of the reading, when Noah had lived 500 years, he had three sons: Shem, Ham, and Japheth. God set the days allowed to man at 120 years. Divine beings admired and took wives from among the daughters of men, who bore the Nephilim, heroes of old, men of renown. The ninth open portion ends here.

As the reading continues with the maftir reading that concludes the parashah, God saw how great man's wickedness was and how man's every plan was evil, and God regretted making man. God expressed an intention to blot men and animals from the earth, but Noah found God's favor. The seventh reading, the tenth open portion, and the parashah end here.

Readings according to the triennial cycle
Jews who read the Torah according to the triennial cycle of Torah reading read the parashah according to the following schedule:

In ancient parallels
The parashah has parallels in these ancient sources:

Genesis chapter 1
Noting that Sargon of Akkad was the first to use a seven-day week, Professor Gregory S. Aldrete speculated that the Israelites may have adopted the idea from the Akkadian Empire.

Genesis chapter 4

In inner-biblical interpretation

Genesis chapter 2

The Sabbath
 refers to the Sabbath. Commentators note that the Hebrew Bible repeats the commandment to observe the Sabbath 12 times.

 reports that on the seventh day of Creation, God finished God’s work, rested, and blessed and hallowed the seventh day.

The Sabbath is one of the Ten Commandments.  commands that one remember the Sabbath day, keep it holy, and not do any manner of work or cause anyone under one's control to work, for in six days God made heaven and earth and rested on the seventh day, blessed the Sabbath, and hallowed it.  commands that one observe the Sabbath day, keep it holy, and not do any manner of work or cause anyone under one's control to work—so that one's subordinates might also rest—and remember that the Israelites were servants in the land of Egypt, and God brought them out with a mighty hand and by an outstretched arm.

And God told Moses to let no one go out of one's place on the seventh day.

In , just before giving Moses the second Tablets of Stone, God commanded that the Israelites keep and observe the Sabbath throughout their generations, as a sign between God and the children of Israel forever, for in six days God made heaven and earth, and on the seventh day God rested.

In , just before issuing the instructions for the Tabernacle, Moses again told the Israelites that no one should work on the Sabbath, specifying that one must not kindle fire on the Sabbath.

In , God told Moses to repeat the Sabbath commandment to the people, calling the Sabbath a holy convocation.

The prophet Isaiah taught in  that iniquity is inconsistent with the Sabbath. In , the prophet taught that if people turn away from pursuing or speaking of business on the Sabbath and call the Sabbath a delight, then God will make them ride upon the high places of the earth and will feed them with the heritage of Jacob.

The prophet Jeremiah taught in  that the fate of Jerusalem depended on whether the people abstained from work on the Sabbath, refraining from carrying burdens outside their houses and through the city gates.

The prophet Ezekiel told in  how God gave the Israelites God's Sabbaths, to be a sign between God and them, but the Israelites rebelled against God by profaning the Sabbaths, provoking God to pour out God's fury upon them, but God stayed God's hand.

In , Nehemiah told how he saw some treading winepresses on the Sabbath, and others bringing all manner of burdens into Jerusalem on the Sabbath day, so when it began to be dark before the Sabbath, he commanded that the city gates be shut and not opened till after the Sabbath and directed the Levites to keep the gates to sanctify the Sabbath.

In early nonrabbinic interpretation
The parashah has parallels or is discussed in these early nonrabbinic sources:

Genesis chapter 2
The Book of Jubilees interpreted God's warning to Adam in  that "on the day that you eat of it you shall die" in the light of the words of Psalm  that "a thousand years in [God's] sight are but as yesterday," noting that Adam died 70 years short of the 1000 years that would constitute one day in the testimony of the heavens. And the Books of 4 Ezra (or 2 Esdras) and 2 Baruch interpreted  to teach that because Adam transgressed God's commandment, God decreed death to Adam and his descendants for all time.

Genesis chapter 4

Philo of Alexandria saw Cain as an example of a "self-loving man" who (in ) showed his gratitude to God too slowly and then not from the first of his fruits. Philo taught that we should hurry to please God without delay. Thus  enjoins, "If you vow a vow, you shall not delay to perform it." Philo explained that a vow is a request to God for good things, and  thus enjoins that when one has received them, one must offer gratitude to God as soon as possible. Philo divided those who fail to do so into three types: (1) those who forget the benefits that they have received, (2) those who from an excessive conceit look upon themselves and not God as the authors of what they receive, and (3) those who realize that God caused what they received, but still say that they deserved it, because they are worthy to receive God's favor. Philo taught that Scripture opposes all three. Philo taught that  replies to the first group who forget, "Take care, lest when you have eaten and are filled, and when you have built fine houses and inhabited them, and when your flocks and your herds have increased, and when your silver and gold, and all that you possess is multiplied, you be lifted up in your heart, and forget the Lord your God." Philo taught that one does not forget God when one remembers one's own nothingness and God's exceeding greatness. Philo interpreted  to reprove those who look upon themselves as the cause of what they have received, telling them: "Say not my own might, or the strength of my right hand has acquired me all this power, but remember always the Lord your God, who gives you the might to acquire power." And Philo read  to address those who think that they deserve what they have received when it says, "You do not enter into this land to possess it because of your righteousness, or because of the holiness of your heart; but, in the first place, because of the iniquity of these nations, since God has brought on them the destruction of wickedness; and in the second place, that He may establish the covenant that He swore to our Fathers." Philo interpreted the term "covenant" figuratively to mean God's graces. Thus Philo concluded that if we discard forgetfulness, ingratitude, and self-love, we shall not longer through our delay miss attaining the genuine worship of God, but we shall meet God, having prepared ourselves to do the things that God commands us.

In classical rabbinic interpretation
The parashah is discussed in these rabbinic sources from the era of the Mishnah and the Talmud:

Genesis chapter 1

And one may investigate from one end of heaven to the other, but one should not investigate what was before this world. Both Rabbi Johanan and Rabbi Eleazar (or other say Resh Lakish) compared this to a human king who instructed his servants to build a great palace on a dunghill. They built it for him. Thereafter, the king did not wish to hear mention of the dunghill. Similarly, the Mishnah taught that one should not teach about the Creation to more than one student.

A Midrash (rabbinic commentary) explained that six things preceded the creation of the world: the Torah and the Throne of Glory were created, the creation of the Patriarchs was contemplated, the creation of Israel was contemplated, the creation of the Temple in Jerusalem was contemplated, and the name of the Messiah was contemplated, as well as repentance.

Rav Zutra bar Tobiah said in the name of Rav that the world was created with ten things: (1) wisdom, (2) understanding, (3) reason, (4) strength, (5) rebuke, (6) might, (7) righteousness, (8) judgment, (9) loving-kindness, and (10) compassion. The Gemara cited verses to support Rav Zutra's proposition: wisdom and understanding, as  says, "The Lord by wisdom founded the earth; and by understanding established the heavens"; reason, as  says, "By His reason the depths were broken up"; strength and might, as  says, "Who by Your strength sets fast the mountains, Who is girded about with might"; rebuke, as  says, "The pillars of heaven were trembling, but they became astonished at His rebuke"; righteousness and judgment, as  says, "Righteousness and judgment are the foundation of Your throne"; and loving-kindness and compassion, as  says, "Remember, O Lord, Your compassions and Your mercies; for they have been from of old."

A Midrash taught that a heretic once asked Rabbi Akiva who created the world. Rabbi Akiva answered that God had. The heretic demanded that Rabbi Akiva give him clear proof. Rabbi Akiva asked him what he was wearing. The heretic said that it was a garment. Rabbi Akiva asked him who made it. The heretic replied that a weaver had. Rabbi Akiva demanded that the heretic give him proof. The heretic asked Rabbi Akiva whether he did not realize that a garment is made by a weaver. Rabbi Akiva replied by asking the heretic whether he did not realize that the world was made by God. When the heretic had left, Rabbi Akiva's disciples asked him to explain his proof. Rabbi Akiva replied that just as a house implies a builder, a dress implies a weaver, and a door implies a carpenter, so the world proclaims the God who created it.

It was taught in a Baraita that King Ptolemy brought together 72 elders, placed them in 72 separate rooms without telling them why, and directed each of them to translate the Torah. God then prompted each one of them, and they all conceived the same idea and wrote for : "God created in the beginning" (instead of "In the beginning, God created," to prevent readers from reading into the text two creating powers, "In the beginning" and "God").

Rav Haviva of Hozna'ah told Rav Assi (or some say that Rav Assi said) that the words, "And it came to pass in the first month of the second year, on the first day of the month," in  showed that the Tabernacle was erected on the first of Nisan. With reference to this, a Tanna taught that the first of Nisan took ten crowns of distinction by virtue of the ten momentous events that occurred on that day.

Similarly, a Baraita compared the day that God created the universe with the day that the Israelites dedicated the Tabernacle. For  says, "And it came to pass (va-yehi) on the eighth day," and  says, "And there was (va-yehi) one day."

The Mishnah taught that God created the world with ten Divine utterances. Noting that surely God could have created the world with one utterance, the Mishnah asks what we are meant to learn from this, replying, if God had created the world by a single utterance, men would think less of the world, and have less compunction about undoing God's creation.

Rabbi Johanan taught that the ten utterances with which God created the world account for the rule taught in a Baraita cited by Rabbi Shimi that no fewer than ten verses of the Torah should be read in the synagogue. The ten verses represent God's ten utterances. For  says, "By the word of the Lord the heavens were made, and all the host of them by the breath of his mouth" (and thus one may learn that the heavens and earth were created by Divine utterance before the action of  takes place).

Rav Judah said in Rav's name that ten things were created on the first day: (1) heaven, (2) earth, (3) chaos (tohu), (4) desolation or void (bohu), (5) light, (6) darkness, (7) wind, (8) water, (9) the length of a day, and (10) the length of a night. The Gemara cited verses to support Rav Judah's proposition: heaven and earth, as  says, "In the beginning God created heaven and earth"; tohu and bohu, as  says, "and the earth was tohu and bohu"; darkness, as  says, "and darkness was upon the face of the deep; light, as  says, "And God said, ‘Let there be light'"; wind and water, as  says, "and the wind of God hovered over the face of the waters"; and the length of a day and the length of a night, as  says, "And there was evening and there was morning, one day." A Baraita taught that tohu (chaos) is a green line that encompasses the world, out of which darkness proceeds, as  says, "He made darkness His hiding-place round about Him"; and bohu (desolation) means the slimy stones in the deep out of which the waters proceed, as  says, "He shall stretch over it the line of confusion (tohu) and the plummet of emptiness (bohu)." The Gemara questioned Rav Judah's assertion that light was created on the first day, as  reports that "God made the two great lights ... and God set them in the firmament of the heaven," and  reports that God did so on the fourth day. The Gemara explained that the light of which Rav Judah taught was the light of which Rabbi Eleazar spoke when he said that by the light that God created on the first day, one could see from one end of the world to the other; but as soon as God saw the corrupt generations of the Flood and the Dispersion, God hid the light from them, as  says, "But from the wicked their light is withheld." Rather, God reserved the light of the first day for the righteous in the time to come, as  says, "And God saw the light, that it was good." The Gemara noted a dispute among the Tannaim over this interpretation. Rabbi Jacob agreed with the view that by the light that God created on the first day one could see from one end of the world to the other. But the Sages equated the light created on the first day with the lights of which  speaks, which God created on the first day, but placed in the heavens on the fourth day.

Rav Judah taught that when God created the world, it went on expanding like two unraveling balls of thread, until God rebuked it and brought it to a standstill, as  says, "The pillars of heaven were trembling, but they became astonished at His rebuke." Similarly, Resh Lakish taught that the words "I am God Almighty" (El Shaddai) in  mean, "I am He Who said to the world: ‘Enough!'" (Dai). Resh Lakish taught that when God created the sea, it went on expanding, until God rebuked it and caused it to dry up, as  says, "He rebukes the sea and makes it dry, and dries up all the rivers."

The Rabbis reported in a Baraita that the House of Shammai taught that heaven was created first and the earth was created afterwards, as  says, "In the beginning God created the heaven and the earth." But the House of Hillel taught that the earth was created first and heaven was created afterwards, as  says, "In the day that the Lord God made earth and heaven." The House of Hillel faulted the House of Shammai for believing that one can build a house's upper stories and afterwards builds the house, as  calls heaven God's "upper chambers," saying, "It is He Who builds His upper chambers in the heaven, and has founded His vault upon the earth." The House of Shammai, in turn, faulted the House of Hillel for believing that a person builds a footstool first, and afterwards builds the throne, as  calls heaven God's throne and the earth God's footstool. But the Sages said that God created both heaven and earth at the same time, as  says, "My hand has laid the foundation of the earth, and My right hand has spread out the heavens: When I call to them, they stand up together." Resh Lakish reconciled the differing verses by positing that God created heaven first, and afterwards created the earth; but when God put them in place, God put the earth in place first, and afterwards put heaven in place.

The Gemara told that Alexander the Great asked the Elders of the Negev which was created first—the heavens or the earth. They answered that the heavens were created first, as  says, "In the beginning, God created the heaven and the earth." Alexander then asked which was created first—light or darkness. They answered that this matter has no solution, as the verses do not indicate an answer. The Gemara asked why the Elders did not say that the darkness was created first, as  says, "Now the earth was unformed and void, and darkness was upon the face of the deep," and only after does  say, "And God said: 'Let there be light. And there was light.'" The Gemara answered its own question by reporting that the Elders reasoned that they must not answer this question, lest Alexander then ask questions about Creation that may not be discussed—what is above the firmament and what is below the earth, what was before Creation, and what will be after the end of the world. The Gemara then asked: if the Elders were concerned about such proscribed questions, then with regard to the creation of heaven as well, they should not have said anything to Alexander, so why did they answer the question about heaven, but not the one about darkness? The Gemara again answered its own question by reporting that initially they assumed that it was merely happenstance that Alexander asked about the creation of the universe, and therefore there was no need for caution. But once they saw that Alexander again asked about the same general matter, they reasoned that they should not answer further, lest Alexander then ask what is above the firmament and what is below the earth, what was before Creation, and what will be after the end of the world.

Rabbi Jose bar Hanina taught that "heaven" (shamayim) means "there is water" (sham mayim). A Baraita taught that it means "fire and water" (eish u'mayim), teaching that God brought fire and water together and mixed them to make the firmament.

Rabbi Yannai taught that from the very beginning of the world’s creation, God foresaw the deeds of the righteous and the wicked. And , "one day" teaches that God gave the righteous one day—Yom Kippur. Similarly, Rabbi Judah bar Simon interpreted , "And God called the light day," to symbolize Jacob/Israel; "and the darkness God called night," to symbolize Esau; "and there was evening," to symbolize Esau; "and there was morning," to symbolize Jacob. And "one day" teaches that God gave Israel one unique day over which darkness has no influence—the Day of Atonement.

The Gemara further hypothesized from its use in  that or  might be read to mean the time when light begins to appear—that is, daybreak. But it is established (in Babylonian Talmud Berakhot 2b) that day continues until stars appear.

The Rabbis taught in a Baraita that once Rabbi Joshua ben Hananiah was standing on a step on the Temple Mount, and Ben Zoma (who was younger than Rabbi Joshua) saw him but did not stand up before him in respect. So Rabbi Joshua asked Ben Zoma what was up. Ben Zoma replied that he was staring at the space between the upper and the lower waters (described in ). Ben Zoma said that there is only a bare three fingers' space between the upper and the lower waters. Ben Zoma reasoned that  says, "And the spirit of God hovered over the face of the waters," implying a distance similar to that of a mother dove that hovers over her young without touching them. But Rabbi Joshua told his disciples that Ben Zoma was still outside the realm of understanding. Rabbi Joshua noted that  says that "the spirit of God hovered over the face of the water" on the first day of Creation, but God divided the waters on the second day, as  reports. (And thus the distance that God hovered above the waters need not be the distance between the upper and lower waters). The Gemara presented various views of how great the distance is between the upper and the lower waters. Rav Aha bar Jacob said that the distance was a hair's breadth. The Rabbis said that the distance was like that between the planks of a bridge. Mar Zutra (or some say Rav Assi) said that the distance was like that between two cloaks spread one over another. And others said that the distance was like that between two cups nested one inside the other.

Rabbi Judah ben Pazi noted that a similar word appears in both —where , rakiya is translated as "firmament"—and —where , vayraku is translated as "and they flattened." He thus deduced from the usage in  that  taught that on the second day of creation, God spread the heavens flat like a cloth. Or Rabbi Judah the son of Rabbi Simon deduced from  that  meant "let a lining be made for the firmament."

A Baraita taught that the upper waters created in  remain suspended by Divine command, and their fruit is the rainwater, and thus  says: "The earth is full of the fruit of Your works." This view accords with that of Rabbi Joshua. Rabbi Eliezer, however, interpreted  to refer to other handiwork of God.

The Pirke De-Rabbi Eliezer recounted that in the Exodus, Moses cried out to God that the enemy was behind them and the sea in front of them, and asked which way they should go. So God sent the angel Michael, who became a wall of fire between the Israelites and the Egyptians. The Egyptians wanted to follow after the Israelites, but they are unable to come near because of the fire. The angels saw the Israelites' misfortune all the night, but they uttered neither praise nor sanctification, as  says, "And the one came not near the other all the night." God told Moses (as  reports) to "Stretch out your hand over the sea, and divide it." So (as  reports) "Moses stretched out his hand over the sea," but the sea refused to be divided. So God looked at the sea, and the waters saw God's Face, and they trembled and quaked, and descended into the depths, as  says, "The waters saw You, O God; the waters saw You, they were afraid: the depths also trembled."

The entire Hebrew calendar—years, months, days, nights, seasons, and intercalation—were before God, and God intercalated the years and delivered the calculations to Adam in the Garden of Eden, as  can be read, "This is the calculation for the generations of Adam." Adam handed on the tradition to Enoch, who was initiated in the principle of intercalation, as  says, "And Enoch walked with God." Enoch passed the principle of intercalation to Noah, who conveyed the tradition to Shem, who conveyed it to Abraham, who conveyed it to Isaac, who conveyed it to Jacob, who conveyed it to Joseph and his brothers. When Joseph and his brothers died, the Israelites ceased to intercalate, as  reports, "And Joseph died, and all his brethren, and all that generation." God then revealed the principles of the Hebrew calendar to Moses and Aaron in Egypt, as  reports, "And the Lord spoke to Moses and Aaron in the land of Egypt saying, ‘This month shall be to you the beginning of months.’" The Pirke De-Rabbi Eliezer deduced from the word "saying" in  that God said to Moses and Aaron that until then, the principle of intercalation had been with God, but from then on it was their right to intercalate the year. Thus the Israelites intercalated the year and will until Elijah returns to herald in the Messianic Age.

Rabbi Johanan taught that the words "and God created the great sea-monsters" in  referred to Leviathan the slant serpent and Leviathan the tortuous serpent, also referred to in  Rav Judah taught in the name of Rav that God created all living things in this world male and female, including Leviathan the slant serpent and Leviathan the tortuous serpent. Had they mated with one another, they would have destroyed the world, so God castrated the male and killed the female, preserving it in salt for the righteous in the world to come, as reported in  when it says: "And he will slay the dragon that is in the sea." Similarly, God also created male and female the "Behemoth upon a thousand hills" referred to in  Had they mated, they also would have destroyed the world, so God castrated the male and cooled the female and preserved it for the righteous for the world to come. Rav Judah taught further in the name of Rav that when God wanted to create the world, God told the angel of the sea to open the angel's mouth and swallow all the waters of the world. Rabbi Isaac deduced from this that the name of the angel of the sea was Rahab, and had the waters not covered Rahab, no creature could have stood the smell.

Rabbi Johanan explained that  uses the plural pronoun when God says, "Let us make man," to teach that God does nothing without consulting God's Heavenly Court of angels (thus instructing us in the proper conduct of humility among subordinates).

Noting that  uses the plural pronoun when God says, "Let us make man," the heretics asked Rabbi Simlai how many deities created the world. Rabbi Simlai replied that wherever one finds a point apparently supporting the heretics, one finds the refutation nearby in the text. Thus  says, "Let us make man" (using the plural pronoun), but then  says, "And God created" (using the singular pronoun). When the heretics had departed, Rabbi Simlai's disciples told him that they thought that he had dismissed the heretics with a mere makeshift, and asked him for the real answer. Rabbi Simlai then told his disciples that in the first instance, God created Adam from dust and Eve from Adam, but thereafter God would create humans (in the words of ) "in Our image, after Our likeness," neither man without woman nor woman without man, and neither of them without the Shechinah (the indwelling nurturing presence of God, designated with a feminine noun).

The Torah answered that the man whom God sought to create would be limited in days and full of anger, and would come into the power of sin. Unless God would be long-suffering with him, the Torah continued, it would be well for man not to come into the world. God asked the Torah whether it was for nothing that God is called "slow to anger" and "abounding in love." God then set about making man.

But as soon as Adam sinned, God placed God's hand upon Adam and diminished him, as  says: "You have fashioned me after and before, and laid Your hand upon me." (And Rav Judah in the name of Rav also taught that as soon as Adam sinned, God placed God's hand upon Adam and diminished him.) The Gemara reconciled the interpretations of Rabbi Eleazar and Rav Judah in the name of Rav by concluding that the distance from the earth to the sky must equal the distance from one end of heaven to the other.

The Rabbis taught in a Baraita that for two and a half years the House of Shammai and the House of Hillel debated, the House of Shammai asserting that it would have been better for humanity not to have been created, and the House of Hillel maintaining that it is better that humanity was created. They finally took a vote and decided that it would have been better for humanity not to have been created, but now that humanity has been created, let us investigate our past deeds or, as others say, let us examine our future actions.

The Mishnah taught that in Second Temple times, Jews would acknowledge God's creation and read the verses of the creation story when representatives of the people would assemble (in watches or ma'amadot) to participate in sacrifices made in Jerusalem on their behalf. The people of the delegation would fast four days during the week that they assembled. On the first day (Sunday), they would read  On the second day, they would read  On the third day, they would read  On the fourth day, they would read  On the fifth day, they would read  And on the sixth day, they would read  Rabbi Ammi taught that if had not been for the worship of these delegations, heaven and earth would not be firmly established, reading  to say, "If it were not for My covenant [observed] day and night, I would not have established the statutes of heaven and earth." And Rabbi Ammi cited  to show that when Abraham asked God how Abraham would know that his descendants would inherit the Land notwithstanding their sins, God replied by calling on Abraham to sacrifice several animals. Rabbi Ammi then reported that Abraham asked God what would happen in times to come when there would be no Temple at which to offer sacrifices. Rabbi Ammi reported that God replied to Abraham that whenever Abraham's descendants will read the sections of the Torah dealing with the sacrifices, God will account it as if they had brought the offerings, and forgive all their sins.

It was recorded in Rabbi Joshua ben Levi's notebook that a person born on the first day of the week (Sunday) will lack one thing. The Gemara explained that the person will be either completely virtuous or completely wicked, because on that day (in ) God created the extremes of light and darkness. A person born on the second day of the week (Monday) will be bad-tempered, because on that day (in ) God divided the waters (and similarly division will exist between this person and others). A person born on the third day of the week (Tuesday) will be wealthy and promiscuous, because on that day (in ) God created fast-growing herbs. A person born on the fourth day of the week (Wednesday) will be bright, because on that day (in ) God set the luminaries in the sky. A person born on the fifth day of the week (Thursday) will practice kindness, because on that day (in ) God created the fish and birds (who find their sustenance through God's kindness). A person born on the eve of the Sabbath (Friday) will be a seeker. Rav Nahman bar Isaac explained: a seeker after good deeds. A person born on the Sabbath (Saturday) will die on the Sabbath, because they had to desecrate the great day of the Sabbath on that person's account to attend to the birth. And Rava son of Rav Shila observed that this person shall be called a great and holy person.

Genesis chapter 2
Rava (or some say Rabbi Joshua ben Levi) taught that even a person who prays on the eve of the Sabbath must recite , "And the heaven and the earth were finished ..." (va-yachulu hashamayim v'haaretz ...), for Rav Hamnuna taught that whoever prays on the eve of the Sabbath and recites "and the heaven and the earth were finished," the Writ treats as though a partner with God in the Creation, for one may read va-yachulu—"and they were finished"—as va-yekallu—"and they finished." Rabbi Eleazar taught that we know that speech is like action because  says, "By the word of the Lord were the heavens made." Rav Hisda said in Mar Ukba's name that when one prays on the eve of the Sabbath and recites "and the heaven and the earth were finished," two ministering angels place their hands on the head of the person praying and say (in the words of ), "Your iniquity is taken away, and your sin purged."

He compared it to a man striking a hammer on an anvil, raising it by day and bringing it down immediately after nightfall. (In the second between raising the hammer and bringing it down, night began. Thus, he taught that God finished God's work right at the end of the sixth day, so that in that very moment the Sabbath began.) Rabbi Simeon bar Yohai taught that mortal humans, who do not know exactly what time it is, must add from the profane to the sacred to avoid working in the sacred time; but God knows time precisely, can enter the Sabbath by a hair's breadth. Genibah and the Rabbis discussed . Genibah compared it to a king who made a bridal chamber, which he plastered, painted, and adorned, so that all that the bridal chamber lacked was a bride to enter it. Similarly, just then, the world lacked the Sabbath. (Thus by means of instituting the Sabbath itself, God completed God's work, and humanity's world, on the seventh day.) The Rabbis compared it to a king who made a ring that lacked only a signet. Similarly, the world lacked the Sabbath. And the Midrash taught that this is one of the texts that they changed for King Ptolemy (as they could not expect him to understand these explanations), making  read, "And He finished on the sixth day, and rested on the seventh." King Ptolemy (or others say, a philosopher) asked the elders in Rome how many days it took God to create the world. The elders replied that it took God six days. He replied that since then, Gehenna has been burning for the wicked. He explained that  states it that way to punish the wicked who destroy the world, which was created with labor, and to give a good reward to the righteous who uphold the world, which was created with toil. Rabbi Levi said in the name of Rabbi Jose ben Nehorai that as long as the hands of their Master were working on them, they went on expanding; but when the hands of their Master rested, rest was afforded to them, and thus God gave rest to the world on the seventh day. Rabbi Abba taught that when a mortal king takes his army to their quarters, he does not distribute largesse (rather, he does that only before the troops go into battle), and when he distributes largesse, he does not order a halt. But God ordered a halt and distributed largesse, as  says, "And He rested ... and He blessed." (Not only did God afford humanity a day of rest, but God also gave humanity the gift of a sacred day.)

Reading , "And on the seventh day God finished the work," the Pirke De-Rabbi Eliezer taught that God created seven dedications (for the creation of each of the seven days). God expressed six of them and reserved one for future generations. Thus, when God created the first day and finished all God's work on it, God dedicated it, as  says, "And it was evening, and it was morning, one day." When God created the second day and finished all God's work in it, God dedicated it, as  says, "And it was evening, and it was morning, a second day." Similar language appears through the six days of creation. God created the seventh day, but not for work, because Genesis does not say in connection the seventh day, "And it was evening and it was morning." That is because God reserved the dedication of the seventh day for the generations to come, as  says, speaking of the Sabbath, "And there shall be one day which is known to the Lord; not day, and not night." The Pirke De-Rabbi Eliezer compared this to a man who had precious utensils that he did not want to leave as an inheritance to anyone but to his son. The Pirke De-Rabbi Eliezer taught that it is likewise with God. God did not want to give the day of blessing and holiness that was before God as an inheritance to anyone but Israel. For when the Israelites left Egypt, before God gave them the Torah, God gave them the Sabbath as an inheritance (as reported in ). Before God gave Israel the Torah, they kept two Sabbaths, as  says first, "And You made known to them Your holy Sabbath." And only afterwards did God give them the Torah, as  says as it continues, "And commanded them commandments, and statutes, and Torah by the hand of Moses, Your servant." God observed and sanctified the Sabbath, and Israel is obliged only to observe and sanctify the Sabbath. For when God gave the Israelites manna, all through the 40 years in the wilderness, God gave it during on the six days during which God had created the world, Sunday through Friday, but on the Sabbath, God did not give them manna. Of course, God had power enough to give them manna every day. But the Sabbath was before God, so God gave the Israelites bread for two days on Friday, as  says, "See, for the Lord has given you the Sabbath, therefore he gives you on the sixth day the bread of two days." When the people saw that God observed the Sabbath, they also rested, as  says, "So the people rested on the seventh day." Reading , "And God blessed the seventh day, and hallowed it," the Pirke De-Rabbi Eliezer taught that God blessed and hallowed the Sabbath day, and Israel is bound only to keep and to hallow the Sabbath day. Hence the Sages said that those who says the benediction and sanctification over the wine on Friday evenings will have their days increased in this world, and in the world to come. For  says, "For by me your days shall be multiplied," signifying in this world. And  continues, "and the years of your life shall be increased" signifying in the world to come.

Rabbi Simeon noted that nearly everywhere, Scripture gives precedence to the creation of heaven over earth. But  says, "the day that the Lord God made earth and heaven" (listing earth before heaven). Rabbi Simeon concluded that  thus teaches that the earth is equivalent to heaven.

So (in the words of ) "they said to God: ‘Depart from us; for we desire not the knowledge of Your ways. What is the Almighty, that we should serve Him? And what profit should we have, if we pray unto Him?'" They scoffed that they needed God for only a few drops of rain, and they deluded themselves that they had rivers and wells that were more than enough for them, and as  reports, "there rose up a mist from the earth." God noted that they took excess pride based upon the goodness that God lavished on them, so God replied that with that same goodness God would punish them. And thus  reports, "And I, behold, I do bring the flood of waters upon the earth."

And God created humanity from one person for the sake of peace, so that none can say that their ancestry is greater than another's. And God created humanity from one person so that heretics cannot say that there are many gods who created several human souls. And God created humanity from one person to demonstrate God's greatness, for people stamp out many coins with one coin press and they all look alike, but God stamped each person with the seal of Adam, and not one of them is like another. Therefore, every person is obliged to say, "For my sake the world was created." It was taught in a Baraita that Rabbi Meir used to say that the dust of the first man (from which  reports God made Adam) was gathered from all parts of the earth, for  says of God, "Your eyes did see my unformed substance," and  says, "The eyes of the Lord run to and fro through the whole earth."

Similarly, the Pirke De-Rabbi Eliezer told that when God began to create the first person, God began to collect dust from the four corners of the world—red, black, white, and yellow. Explaining why God gathered the first person's dust from the four corners of the world, God said that if a person should travel from the east to the west, or from the west to the east, and the time should come for the person to depart from the world, then the earth would not be able to tell the person that the dust of the person's body was not of the earth there, and that the person needed to return to the place from which the person had been created. This teaches that in every place where a person comes or goes, should the person approach the time to die, in that place is the dust of the person's body, and there the person's body will return to the dust, as  says, "For dust you are, and to dust shall you return."

Rav Nahman bar Rav Hisda taught that the word וַיִּיצֶר, wa-yitzer is written with two yuds to show that God created people with two inclinations (yetzerim), one good and one evil. Rav Nahman bar Isaac demurred, arguing that according to this logic, animals, of which  writes , wa-yitzer with a single yud, should have no evil inclination (yetzer hara), but we see that they injure, bite, and kick, plainly evincing an evil inclination. Rather, Rabbi Simeon ben Pazzi explained that the two yuds by saying, "Woe is me because of my Creator (yotzri), woe is me because of my evil inclination (yitzri)!" Rabbi Simeon ben Pazzi thus indicated that the two yuds indicate the human condition, where God punishes us for giving in to our evil inclination, but our evil inclination tempts us when we try to resist. Alternatively, Rabbi Jeremiah ben Eleazar explained that the two yuds reflect that God created two countenances in the first man, one man and one woman, back to back, as  says, "Behind and before have You formed me."

A Midrash deduced from similarities in the language of the creation of humanity and the Sabbath commandment that God gave Adam the precept of the Sabbath.

Similarly, a Midrash recounts that Rabbi Jeremiah ben Leazar taught that when God created Adam, God created him a hermaphrodite—two bodies, male and female, joined together—for  says, "male and female created He them ... and called their name Adam." Rabbi Samuel bar Nahman taught that when God created Adam, God created Adam double-faced, then God split Adam and made Adam of two backs, one back on this side and one back on the other side. An objection was raised that  says, "And He took one of his ribs" (implying that God created Eve separately from Adam).

Reading God's observation in  that "it is not good that the man should be alone," a Midrash taught that a man without a wife dwells without good, without help, without joy, without blessing, and without atonement. Without good, as  says that "it is not good that the man should be alone." Without joy, as  says, "And you shall rejoice, you and your household" (implying that one can rejoice only when there is a "household" with whom to rejoice). Without a blessing, as  can be read, "To cause a blessing to rest on you for the sake of your house" (that is, for the sake of your wife). Without atonement, as  says, "And he shall make atonement for himself, and for his house" (implying that one can make complete atonement only with a household). Rabbi Simeon said in the name of Rabbi Joshua ben Levi, without peace too, as 1 Samuel  says, "And peace be to your house." Rabbi Joshua of Siknin said in the name of Rabbi Levi, without life too, as Ecclesiastes  says, "Enjoy life with the wife whom you love." Rabbi Hiyya ben Gomdi said, also incomplete, as  says, "male and female created He them, and blessed them, and called their name Adam," that is, "man" (and thus only together are they "man"). Some say a man without a wife even impairs the Divine likeness, as  says, "For in the image of God made God man," and immediately thereafter  says, "And you, be fruitful, and multiply (implying that the former is impaired if one does not fulfill the latter).

The Gemara taught that all agree that there was only one formation of humankind (not a separate creation of man and woman). Rav Judah, however, noted an apparent contradiction:  says, "And God created man in His own image" (in the singular), while  says, "Male and female created He them" (in the plural). Rav Judah reconciled the apparent contradiction by concluding that in the beginning God intended to create two human beings, and in the end God created only one human being.

One said that this "rib" was a face, the other that it was a tail. In support of the one who said it was a face,  says, "Behind and before have You formed me." The one who said it was a tail explained the words, "Behind and before have You formed me," as Rabbi Ammi said, that humankind was "behind," that is, later, in the work of creation, and "before" in punishment. The Gemara conceded that humankind was last in the work of creation, for God created humankind on the eve of the Sabbath. But if when saying that humankind was first for punishment, one means the punishment in connection with the serpent, Rabbi taught that, in conferring honor the Bible commences with the greatest, in cursing with the least important. Thus, in cursing, God began with the least, cursing first the serpent, then the people. The punishment of the Flood must therefore be meant, as  says, "And He blotted out every living substance which was upon the face of the ground, both man and cattle," starting with the people. But the one who said Eve was created from a tail explained the word , wa-yitzer as Rabbi Simeon ben Pazzi said, "Woe is me because of my Creator (yotzri), woe is me because of my evil inclination (yitzri)!" In support of the one who said that Eve was created from a face,  says, "male and female God created them." Rabbi Abbahu reconciled these statements by teaching that at first God intended to create two, but in the end created only one. In support of the one who said that Eve was created from a face,  says, "He closed up the place with flesh instead thereof." But the one who said Eve was created from a tail explained the words, "He closed up the place with flesh instead thereof," as Rabbi Jeremiah (or as some say Rav Zebid, or others say Rav Nahman bar Isaac) said, that these words applied only to the place where God made the cut. In support of the one who said that Eve was created from a tail,  says, "God built." But the one who said that Eve was created from a face explained the words "God built" as explained by Rabbi Simeon ben Menasia, who interpreted the words, "and the Lord built the rib," to teach that God braided Eve's hair and brought her to Adam, for in the seacoast towns braiding (keli'ata) is called building (binyata). Alternatively, Rav Hisda said (or some say it was taught in a Baraita) that the words, "and the Lord built the rib," teach that God built Eve after the fashion of a storehouse, narrow at the top and broad at the bottom so as to hold the produce safely. So Rav Hisda taught that a woman is narrower above and broader below so as better to carry children.

The Rabbis taught in a Baraita that if an orphan applied to the community for assistance to marry, the community must rent a house, supply a bed and necessary household furnishings, and put on the wedding, as  says, "sufficient for his need, whatever is lacking for him." The Rabbis interpreted the words "sufficient for his need" to refer to the house, "whatever is lacking" to refer to a bed and a table, and "for him (lo)" to refer to a wife, as  uses the same term, "for him (lo)," to refer to Adam's wife, whom  calls "a helpmate for him."

So God removed her from Adam and recreated her a second time.

Rabbi José taught that Isaac observed three years of mourning for his mother Sarah. After three years he married Rebekah, and forgot the mourning for his mother. Hence Rabbi José taught that until a man marries a wife, his love centers on his parents. When he marries a wife, he bestows his love upon his wife, as  says, "Therefore shall a man leave his father and his mother, and he shall cleave unto his wife."

Genesis chapter 3
Hezekiah deduced from this that one who adds to God's words in fact subtracts from them.

God cursed the serpent, but the Israelites did not learn a lesson from the serpent's fate, and nonetheless spoke slander. God therefore sent the serpent, who was the first to introduce slander, to punish those who spoke slander.

Rabbi Samuel bar Nahman said in Rabbi Jonathan's name that we can deduce from the story of the serpent in  that one should not plead on behalf of one who instigates idolatry. For Rabbi Simlai taught that the serpent had many pleas that it could have advanced, but it did not do so. And God did not plead on the serpent's behalf, because it offered no plea itself. The Gemara taught that the serpent could have argued that when the words of the teacher and the pupil are contradictory, one should surely obey the teacher's (and so Eve should have obeyed God's command).

A Baraita reported that Rabbi taught that in conferring an honor, we start with the most important person, while in conferring a curse, we start with the least important.  demonstrates that in conferring an honor, we start with the most important person, for when Moses instructed Aaron, Eleazar, and Ithamar that they should not conduct themselves as mourners, Moses spoke first to Aaron and only thereafter to Aaron's sons Eleazar and Ithamar. And  demonstrates that in conferring a curse, we start with the least important, for God cursed the serpent first, and only thereafter cursed Eve and then Adam.

Rabbi Ammi taught that there is no death without sin, as  says, "The soul that sins ... shall die." The Gemara reported an objection based on the following Baraita: The ministering angels asked God why God imposed the death penalty on Adam (in ). God answered that God gave Adam an easy command, and he violated it. The angels objected that Moses and Aaron fulfilled the whole Torah, but they died. God replied (in the words of ), "There is one event [death] to the righteous and to the wicked; to the good and to the clean and to the unclean; ... as is the good, so is the sinner." The Gemara concluded that the Baraita refuted Rabbi Ammi, and there is indeed death without sin and suffering without iniquity.

Rabbi Simeon ben Lakish taught that humanity is fortunate that we did not remain subject to the first decree. Abaye (or others say Simeon ben Lakish) observed that we are still not altogether removed from the benefits of the first decree, as we eat herbs of the field (which come forth without effort).

Rabbi Hama son of Rabbi Hanina taught that  demonstrates one of God's attributes that humans should emulate. Rabbi Hama son of Rabbi Hanina asked what  means in the text, "You shall walk after the Lord your God." How can a human being walk after God, when  says, "[T]he Lord your God is a devouring fire"? Rabbi Hama son of Rabbi Hanina explained that the command to walk after God means to walk after the attributes of God. As God clothes the naked—for  says, "And the Lord God made for Adam and for his wife coats of skin, and clothed them"—so should we also clothe the naked. God visited the sick—for  says, "And the Lord appeared to him by the oaks of Mamre" (after Abraham was circumcised in )—so should we also visit the sick. God comforted mourners—for  says, "And it came to pass after the death of Abraham, that God blessed Isaac his son"—so should we also comfort mourners. God buried the dead—for  says, "And He buried him in the valley"—so should we also bury the dead. Similarly, the Sifre on  taught that to walk in God's ways means to be (in the words of ) "merciful and gracious."

Genesis chapter 4
It was taught in a Baraita that Issi ben Judah said that there are five verses in the Torah whose grammatical construction cannot be decided. (Each verse contains a phrase that a reader can link to the clause either before it or after it.) (One could read  to mean: If you do well, good! But you must bear the sin, if you do not do well. Or one could read  to mean, in the usual interpretation: If you do well, there will be forgiving, or "lifting up of face." And if you do not do well, sin couches at the door. In the first reading, the reader attaches the term "lifted up" to the following clause. In the second reading, the reader attaches the term "lifted up" to the preceding clause.)

The Rabbis taught in a Baraita that  says of the Torah, "So you fix (ve-samtem) these My words in your heart and in your soul." The Rabbis taught that one should read the word samtem rather as sam tam (meaning "a perfect remedy"). The Rabbis thus compared the Torah to a perfect remedy. The Rabbis compared this to a man who struck his son a strong blow, and then put a compress on the son's wound, telling his son that so long as the compress was on his wound, he could eat and drink at will, and bathe in hot or cold water, without fear. But if the son removed the compress, his skin would break out in sores. Even so, did God tell Israel that God created the Evil Inclination, but also created the Torah as its antidote. God told Israel that if they occupied themselves with the Torah, they would not be delivered into the hand of the Evil Inclination, as  says: "If you do well, shall you not be exalted?" But if Israel did not occupy themselves with the Torah, they would be delivered into the hand of the Evil Inclination, as  says: "sin couches at the door." Moreover, the Rabbis taught, the Evil Inclination is altogether preoccupied to make people sin, as  says: "and to you shall be his desire." Yet if one wishes, one can rule over the Evil Inclination, as  says: "and you shall rule over him." Rav Isaac taught that a person's Evil Inclination renews itself against that person daily, as  says, "Every imagination of the thoughts of his heart was only evil every day." And Rabbi Simeon ben Levi (or others say Rabbi Simeon ben Lakish) taught that a person's Evil Inclination gathers strength against that person daily and seeks to slay that person, as  says, "The wicked watches the righteous, and seeks to slay him." And if God were not to help a person, one would not be able to prevail against one's Evil Inclination, for as  says, "The Lord will not leave him in his hand."

Rav taught that the evil inclination resembles a fly, which dwells between the two entrances of the heart, as  says, "Dead flies make the ointment of the perfumers fetid and putrid." But Samuel said that the evil inclination is a like a kind of wheat (chitah), as  says, "Sin (chatat) couches at the door." (The Talmudic commentator Maharsha read Samuel's teaching to relate to the view that the forbidden fruit of which Adam ate was wheat.)

The Midrash taught that they divided the world between them. The first took the movables and the second took the land. The second told the first that he was standing on the second's land. The first retorted that the second was wearing the first's clothes. The first told the second to strip off his clothes. The second retorted that the first should fly off his ground. Out of this quarrel, as  reports, "Cain rose up against his brother Abel." Rabbi Joshua of Siknin said in Rabbi Levi's name, however, that Cain and Abel quarreled because one said that the Temple would have to be built in his area, while the other claimed that it would have to be built in his. For  says, "And it came to pass, when they were in the field," and "field" refers to the Temple, as  equates the two when it says, "Sion (that is, the Temple) shall be plowed as a field." Out of this argument (in the words of ), "Cain rose up against Abel his brother, and slew him." Judah the son of Rabbi, however, said that their quarrel was about the first Eve. But Rabbi Aibu said that the first Eve had by then returned to dust. Rav Huna taught that Cain and Abel quarreled over an additional twin daughter who was born with Abel, whom each brother claimed for his own. Cain said that he would have her, because he was the firstborn, while Abel maintained that he would have to have her, because she was born with him.

From the ground, Cain asked Abel what he would tell their father if Abel killed him. At this, Abel was filled with pity for Cain and relented, and immediately Cain rose against Abel and killed him. Out of that incident was born the proverb, "Do not do good to an evil man, then evil will not befall you."

The Mishnah taught that court officials admonished witnesses testifying in capital cases to beware that the blood of the defendant and all the defendant's offspring to the end of the world depended on the witness, for  says concerning Cain that "the bloods of your brother cry ... from the ground," using the plural "bloods" to signify the victim's blood and the blood of the victim's offspring. And thus Providence considers one who destroys a single person as one who has destroyed an entire world, and Providence considers one who saves a single person as one who has saved an entire world. The Mishnah reported that another interpretation of "brother's bloods" was that Abel's blood spattered in several places on the surrounding trees and stones.

Rabbi Simeon bar Yohai compared Cain and Abel to two gladiators fighting before a king. Had the king wished, he could have separated them, but he did not do so. One overcame the other and killed him. Before he died, the victim cried out to the king for help. Rabbi Simeon thus noted that changing one letter in  would cause God's statement to read, "The voice of your brother's blood cries out against Me." Rabbi Simeon said that it is difficult to say this thing, and the mouth cannot utter it plainly (but by God's inaction, God was involved in Abel's murder).

Reading in  that God said, "every living substance (yekum) that I have made will I blot out," Rabbi Abin taught that this included the one who rose up (yakam) against his brother—Cain. Rabbi Levi said in the name of Resh Lakish that God kept Cain's judgment in suspense until the Flood and then God swept Cain away. And thus Rabbi Levi read  to say, "And He blotted out every one that had arisen."

She was called Naamah, because her deeds were pleasing (ne'imim). But the Rabbis said that Naamah was a woman of a different stamp, for her name denotes that she sang (man'emet) to the timbrel in honor of idolatry.

Genesis chapter 5
In the day that God created humankind, it was in the likeness of God," are an even greater general rule of the Torah.

The Mishnah taught that  enumerated ten generations from Adam to Noah to demonstrate how patient God is, for according to the Mishnah, all those generations provoked God, until God brought on them the waters of the flood.

Rabbi Tanhuma taught in Rabbi Banayah's name, and Rabbi Berekiah taught in Rabbi Eleazar's name, that God created Adam a shapeless mass, and Adam lay stretching from one end of the world to the other, as  says, "Your eyes did see my shapeless mass." Rabbi Judah ben Rabbi Simon taught that while Adam lay a shapeless mass before God, God showed Adam every succeeding generation of mankind and its Sages, judges, scribes, interpreters, and leaders.

The Mishnah taught that a man should not give up trying to be fruitful and multiply unless he has children. The House of Shammai said unless he has two boys. The House of Hillel said unless he has a boy and a girl, since  says, "male and female created He them."

Rabbi Jeremiah ben Eleazar read , "And Adam lived a hundred and thirty years and begot a son in his own likeness, after his own image," to imply that until that time, Adam did not beget after his own image. Rabbi Jeremiah ben Eleazar thus concluded that in the 130 years after Adam’s expulsion from the Garden of Eden, Adam begot ghosts and demons. But the Gemara raised an objection from a Baraita: Rabbi Meir taught that Adam was a great saint. According to Rabbi Meir, when Adam saw that through him death was ordained as a punishment, he spent 130 years fasting, severed connection with his wife, and wore clothes of fig leaves. Thus the Gemara asked how Adam could have begotten evil beings. The Gemara suggested an explanation to harmonize the two positions: The semen that Adam emitted accidentally caused ghosts and demons to come into being.

In contrast, the Pirke De-Rabbi Eliezer read , "And Adam lived a hundred and thirty years and begot a son in his own likeness, after his own image," to imply that Cain was not of Adam's seed, nor after his likeness, nor after his image. The Pirke De-Rabbi Eliezer taught that Adam did not beget in his own image until Seth was born, who was after his father Adam’s likeness and image. Thus Rabbi Simeon taught that from Seth arose and were descended all the generations of the righteous. And from Cain arose and were descended all the generations of the wicked.

Noting that  says of Enoch not that he died, but that "God took him," some sectarians (Judeo-Christians or Christians) challenged Rabbi Abbahu, saying that they did not find that Enoch died, but that God "took" him, just as  says that God would "take" Elijah.

Also interpreting , Rabbi Aibu taught that Enoch was a hypocrite, acting sometimes righteously and sometimes wickedly. So God removed Enoch while Enoch was acting righteously, judging Enoch on Rosh Hashanah, when God judges the whole world.

Genesis chapter 6
So Rav Ashi replied that wa-yehi sometimes presages misfortune, and sometimes it does not, but the expression "and it came to pass in the days of" always presages misfortune.

Rabbi Simeon bar Yohai taught that all real demoralization proceeds from the leaders, as they are in a position to stop it. Rabbi Haninah and Resh Lakish reasoned that  calls them "the sons of God" because they lived a long time without trouble or suffering.

Rav Huna said in Rav Joseph's name that the generation of the flood were not blotted out from the world until they composed nuptial songs (or others say, wrote marriage contracts) in honor of pederasty and bestiality.

The Mishnah concluded that the generation of the Flood and the generation of the dispersion after the Tower of Babel were both so evil as to have no share in the world to come. Rabbi Akiva deduced from the words of  that the generation of the flood will have no portion in the world to come; he read the words "and every living substance was destroyed" to refer to this world and the words "that was on the face of the ground" to refer to the next world. Rabbi Judah ben Bathyra deduced from the words "My spirit will not always enter into judgment with man" of  that God will neither revive nor judge the generation of the flood on Judgment Day.

Noting that  calls Noah "a man" (ish), a Midrash taught that wherever Scripture employs the term "a man" (ish), it indicates a righteous man who warned his generation. The Midrash taught that for 120 years (deduced from ), Noah planted cedars and cut them down. When they would ask him what he was doing, he would reply that God had informed him that God was bringing a flood. Noah's contemporaries replied that if a flood did come, it would come only on Noah's father's house. Rabbi Abba taught that God said that one herald arose for God in the generation of the Flood—Noah. But they despised him and called him a contemptible old man.

Reading in  that "it came to pass, after seven days, that the waters of the flood were upon the earth," the Gemara asked what the nature of these seven days was (that God delayed the flood on their account). Rav taught that these were the days of mourning for Methuselah, and thus that lamenting the righteous postpones retribution. Another explanation is that during "the seven days" God reversed the order of nature (bereishit) (established at the beginning of creation), and the sun rose in the west and set in the east (so that sinners might be shocked into repentance). Another explanation is that God first appointed for them a long time (the 120 years to which  alludes), and then a short time (a seven-day grace period in which to repent). Another explanation is that during "the seven days," God gave them a foretaste of the world to come, so that they might know the nature of the rewards of which they were depriving themselves.

The Tosefta taught that the flood killed people before animals (as seen in the order of ), because man sinned first (as shown in ).

Rabbi Johanan taught that because the corruption of the generation of the Flood was great, their punishment was also great.  characterizes their corruption as great (rabbah), saying, "And God saw that the wickedness of man was great in the earth." And  characterizes their punishment as great (rabbah), saying, "on the same day were all the fountains of the great deep broken up." Rabbi Johanan reported that three of those great thermal fountains remained open after the Flood—the gulf of Gaddor, the hot-springs of Tiberias, and the great well of Biram.

In , the heart grieves. A Midrash catalogued the wide range of additional capabilities of the heart reported in the Hebrew Bible. The heart speaks, sees, hears, walks, falls, stands, rejoices, cries, is comforted, is troubled, becomes hardened, grows faint, fears, can be broken, becomes proud, rebels, invents, cavils, overflows, devises, desires, goes astray, lusts, is refreshed, can be stolen, is humbled, is enticed, errs, trembles, is awakened, loves, hates, envies, is searched, is rent, meditates, is like a fire, is like a stone, turns in repentance, becomes hot, dies, melts, takes in words, is susceptible to fear, gives thanks, covets, becomes hard, makes merry, acts deceitfully, speaks from out of itself, loves bribes, writes words, plans, receives commandments, acts with pride, makes arrangements, and aggrandizes itself.

The School of Rabbi Ishmael deduced from  that death was decreed against Noah too, but that he found favor in the eyes of God.

In medieval rabbinic interpretation

The parashah is discussed in these medieval rabbinic sources:

Genesis chapter 1

Baḥya explained that necessity brought people to anthropomorphize God and describe God in terms of human attributes so that human listeners could grasp God in their minds. After doing so, people can learn that such description was only metaphorical, and that the truth is too fine, too sublime, too exalted, and too remote from the ability and powers of human minds to grasp. Baḥya advised wise thinkers to endeavor to remove the husk of the terms and their corporeality and ascend in their minds step by step to reach the true intended meaning according to the power and ability of their minds to grasp. Baḥya cautioned that one must be careful not to take descriptions of God's attributes literally or in a physical sense. Rather, one must know that they are metaphors, geared to what we are capable of grasping with our powers of understanding, because of our urgent need to know God. But God is infinitely greater and loftier than all of these attributes.

Genesis chapter 4

Judah Halevi taught that Adam lived on the land that contained the Cave of Machpelah, and it was the first object of jealousy and envy between Cain and Abel. The two brothers wanted to know which of them would succeed Adam and inherit his essence, intrinsic perfection, and land—who would stand in connection with the Divine Influence, while the other would be a nonentity. When Cain killed Abel, the realm was without an heir.

Nevertheless,  teaches "you may rule over it" if one so desires, for one may mend one's ways and remove it.

Maimonides read  to refer to the evil inclination (yetzer ha-ra). Maimonides taught that the three terms—the adversary (ha-satan), the evil inclination (yetzer ha-ra), and the angel of death—all designate the same thing. And actions ascribed to these three are in reality the actions of one and the same agent. Thus, the adversary turns people away from the way of truth, and leads them astray in the way of error. Maimonides reported that the Sages also said that people receive the evil inclination at birth, for  says, "at the door sin crouches," and  says, "And the imagination of the heart of man is evil from his youth." The good inclination, however, is developed. Maimonides taught that the Sages refer to the evil inclination and the good inclination when they tell that every person is accompanied by two angels, one on the right side and one on the left, one good and one bad.

In modern interpretation

The parashah is discussed in these modern sources:

Genesis chapter 1
Moshe Chaim Luzzatto (the RaMCHaL) posited that God's purpose in creation was to give a gift from God's good to another being. Since God is perfect, it would have been insufficient for God to give merely a partial good. Rather, God would have to give the ultimate good that God's creation—humankind—could receive. As God is the true good, that ultimate good is found in God. Allowing God's creatures to become more attached to God would thus allow them to experience this ultimate receivable good. Thus, the purpose of creation was to bring into existence a creature who could derive pleasure from God's own good. God further recognized that for humanity to most enjoy this good, humanity would have to feel that humanity had earned it. God therefore arranged that humanity be able to perceive right and wrong, and have access to both. God thus gave humanity the means to earn the attachment to God that God sought to give.

A: Time: "There was evening and morning ..."
B: Command: "God said, ‘Let there be ...’"
C: Execution: "And it was so."
B1: Assessment: "God saw that it was good."
A1: Time: "There was evening and morning ..."

Government and religion, Mendelssohn asserted, have for their object the promotion, by means of public measures, of human felicity in this life and in the life to come. Both act upon people’s convictions and actions, on principles and their application; the state, by means of reasons based on the relations between people, or between people and nature, and religion by means of reasons based on the relations between people and God. The state treats people as the immortal children of the earth; religion treats people as the image of their Creator.

Genesis chapter 2
Professor Robert A. Oden taught that the Jahwist's creation story in  reflects that human beings are dissatisfied by our status as mortals, knowing less than we would like to know. In the Jahwist's Genesis, this dissatisfaction repeatedly gets people into trouble, but the author still, in Oden's reading, finds this human trait admirable, the source of cultural advances. Oden taught that Judaism never read the story as Original Sin or the Fall of Man, but as just one more instance of human beings getting into trouble, and God rescuing them and giving them another chance.

Genesis chapter 6

Commandments
According to the Sefer ha-Chinuch, a noted authority on the commandments, there is one positive commandment in the parashah:
To "be fruitful and multiply"

Most rabbis agree, based on the Shulchan Aruch, that one does not have to have children but merely try to. Raising adopted children as your own also fulfils this mitzvah.

Haftarah

A haftarah is a text selected from the books of Nevi'im ("The Prophets") that is read publicly in the synagogue after the reading of the Torah on Sabbath and holiday mornings. The haftarah usually has a thematic link to the Torah reading that precedes it.

The specific text read following Parashah Bereshit varies according to different traditions within Judaism. Examples are:
for Ashkenazi Jews: 
for Sephardi Jews, Frankfurt am Main, and Chabad Lubavitch: 
for Yemenite Jews: 
for Italian Jews: 
for Karaite Jews:

Connection to the parashah
The parashah and haftarah in  both report God's absolute power.  and  both tell of God's creation of heaven and earth. And the haftarah puts the idea of "opening . . . eyes" (in ) in more favorable light than does the parashah (in ).

In the liturgy

Following the Kabbalat Shabbat service and prior to the Friday evening (Ma'ariv) service, Jews traditionally read rabbinic sources on the observance of the Sabbath, including an excerpt from Babylonian Talmud Shabbat 119b. In Shabbat 119b, Rava instructed that one should recite  on the eve of the Sabbath.

Reuven Kimelman found in the "awake and arise" stanza of the Lekhah Dodi poem a play between the root or, from which stems the word for "skin" or "leather," and the homonym or that means "light." In , Adam exchanged garments of light for garments of leather; the Lekhah Dodi poem calls on God to exchange our current garments of skin for garments of light.

The Weekly Maqam
In the Weekly Maqam, Sephardi Jews each week base the songs of the services on the content of that week's parashah. For Parashat Bereshit, which begins the Torah, Sephardi Jews apply Maqam Rast, the maqam that shows a beginning or an initiation of something.

See also

Adam in rabbinic literature
Curse and mark of Cain
Fall of man
Noah in rabbinic literature

Notes

Further reading
The parashah has parallels or is discussed in these sources:

Ancient
Enûma Elish.
Epic of Gilgamesh: 11:258–307.
Hesiod. Theogony Greece, circa 700 BCE. (creation story).

Biblical
,  (to be fruitful).
 (Nephilim);  (talking animal).
.
.
; ; .
; ; ;  (creation).
, 22, 26–28 (cherubim; firmament; man in God's image);  (cherubim);  (Eden).
.
; ; ; ; ; ; ; .
.
; ; .

Early nonrabbinic
The Genesis Apocryphon Dead Sea scroll 1Q20. Land of Israel, 1st century BCE. In Géza Vermes. The Complete Dead Sea Scrolls in English, pages 448–450. New York: Penguin Press, 1997.
Josephus. Antiquities of the Jews book 1, chapter 1, paragraphs 1–4 ; chapter 2, paragraphs 1–3; chapter 3, paragraphs 1–2, 4 . Circa 93–94. In, e.g., The Works of Josephus: Complete and Unabridged, New Updated Edition. Translated by William Whiston, pages 29–33. Peabody, Massachusetts: Hendrickson Publishers, 1987.
John  (creation).

Qur'an 2:31–37, 117; 3:33–34; 5:27–32. Arabia, 7th century.

Classical rabbinic
Mishnah: Taanit 4:3; Megillah 3:6; Chagigah 2:1; Yevamot 6:6; Sanhedrin 4:5, 10:3; Avot 5:1–2; Chullin 5:5; Mikvaot 5:4. Land of Israel, circa 200 CE. In, e.g., The Mishnah: A New Translation. Translated by Jacob Neusner, pages 313–314, 321, 330, 352, 591, 605, 685, 777, 1067. New Haven: Yale University Press, 1988.
Tosefta: Peah 4:10; Chagigah 2:6; Ketubot 6:8; Sotah 3:7, 9, 4:11, 17–18, 10:2; Sanhedrin 13:6; Keritot 4:15. Land of Israel, circa 250 CE. In, e.g., The Tosefta: Translated from the Hebrew, with a New Introduction. Translated by Jacob Neusner, pages 72, 669, 762, 840, 848–849, 875, 1190, 1570. Peabody, Massachusetts: Hendrickson Publishers, 2002.
Jerusalem Talmud: Berakhot 6a–b, 83b, 84b, 86b, 90a; Peah 8a; Kilayim 4b, 5b–6a; Terumot 101a; Shabbat 24b, 54a; Yoma 29a; Sukkah 7b; Rosh Hashanah 1b, 17b; Taanit 9b, 16b, 24b, 30a; Megillah 6a; Chagigah 9b–10a, 11b–12a; Sanhedrin 28b. Tiberius, Land of Israel, circa 400 CE. In, e.g., Talmud Yerushalmi. Edited by Chaim Malinowitz, Yisroel Simcha Schorr, and Mordechai Marcus, volumes 1–3, 5, 8, 13–14, 21–22, 24–27. Brooklyn: Mesorah Publications, 2005–2014.
Genesis Rabbah 1:1–29:5; 30:7–8; 31:1; 32:7; 33:3; 34:9, 13; 38:4, 9; 42:3; 44:17; 49:2; 50:7; 51:2; 53:8; 54:1; 61:4; 64:2; 65:13; 73:3; 80:5–6; 82:14; 85:2; 89:2; 92:6, 8; 97; 100:7. Land of Israel, 5th century. In, e.g., Midrash Rabbah: Genesis. Translated by Harry Freedman and Maurice Simon. London: Soncino Press, 1939.
Leviticus Rabbah 1:9; 6:6; 9:3, 6, 9; 10:5, 9; 11:1, 2, 7; 13:5; 14:1; 15:1, 9; 18:2; 19:6; 20:2; 22:2; 23:3, 9; 25:3; 27:1, 5; 29:11; 30:4; 31:1, 8; 33:6; 35:6, 8; 36:1, 4. Land of Israel, 5th century. In, e.g., Midrash Rabbah: Leviticus. Translated by Harry Freedman and Maurice Simon. London: Soncino Press, 1939.
Esther Rabbah: prologue 10–11; 3:9; 7:11; 9:2–3. 5th–11th centuries. In, e.g., Midrash Rabbah: Esther. Translated by Maurice Simon, volume 9, pages 14–15, 52, 74–75, 84, 88, 112–113. London: Soncino Press, 1939.

Babylonian Talmud: Berakhot 2a, 26a, 34b, 57b, 59b, 61a; Shabbat 88a, 89a, 95a, 109a, 111a, 118b, 119b; Eruvin 13b, 18a–b, 27b, 100b; Pesachim 2a, 54a, 72b, 88a, 118a; Yoma 20b, 23a, 44b, 52b, 67b, 75a; Sukkah 11b, 49a, 52b; Beitzah 36b; Rosh Hashanah 11a, 24b, 31a; Taanit 8a, 9b, 10a, 22b, 26a, 27b; Megillah 10b, 20b, 22a, 25a, 28a; Moed Katan 7b, 8b, 16a, 17a, 18b, 23a, 24b; Chagigah 2b, 11b–12b, 13b, 15a; Yevamot 61a–63a, 65b, 121a; Ketubot 5a, 8a, 10b, 61a, 67b; Nedarim 39b, 41a; Sotah 9b, 12a, 14a; Gittin 43b, 60a; Kiddushin 6a, 13b, 30b, 35a, 61b; Bava Kamma 55a; Bava Metzia 18a, 85b; Bava Batra 16a–b, 74b, 84a, 113a, 121a; Sanhedrin 29a, 37a–b, 38b–39a, 46b, 56a–b, 58a, 59b, 67b, 70b, 91b, 99a, 101b, 107b–108b, 110a, 113b; Makkot 23a; Shevuot 47b; Avodah Zarah 3a, 5a, 11b, 29a, 43b; Zevachim 116a; Menachot 29b; Chullin 26b, 27b, 60a–b, 71a, 83a; Bekhorot 8a, 47a, 55a–b; Tamid 31b–32a; Niddah 22b, 25a, 30b, 45b. Sasanian Empire, 6th century. In, e.g., Talmud Bavli. Edited by Yisroel Simcha Schorr, Chaim Malinowitz, and Mordechai Marcus, 72 volumes. Brooklyn: Mesorah Publications, 2006.
Song of Songs Rabbah 1:6, 16, 17, 25, 47; 2:41, 47; 3:18, 22; 4:32; 5:1, 13; 6:25; 7:17; 8:1. 6th–7th centuries. In, e.g., Midrash Rabbah: Song of Songs. Translated by Maurice Simon, volume 9, pages 27, 31, 44, 67, 134, 163, 168, 226, 228–229, 243, 268, 299, 302. London: Soncino Press, 1939.
Ruth Rabbah: prologue 7; 1:4; 2:3; 5:2; 8:1. 6th–7th centuries. In, e.g., Midrash Rabbah: Ruth. Translated by L. Rabinowitz, volume 8, pages 13, 19, 28, 59, 93. London: Soncino Press, 1939.
Ecclesiastes Rabbah 1:3, 12–14, 35–37; 2:15, 23, 26–27; 3:1, 13–15, 17–18, 22; 5:7, 11; 6:9; 7:6–7, 20, 33, 35, 39, 42; 8:2; 9:8; 10:12. 6th–8th centuries. In, e.g., Midrash Rabbah: Esther. Translated by Maurice Simon, volume 8, pages 6, 19, 44, 47, 50, 63, 67, 70, 74, 86, 89, 91, 95, 99, 108, 139, 145, 163, 174–175, 196, 204, 206, 209, 212, 214, 238–239, 274. London: Soncino Press, 1939.

Medieval
Deuteronomy Rabbah 2:13, 25; 4:5; 6:11; 8:1; 9:8; 10:2. Land of Israel, 9th century. In, e.g., Midrash Rabbah: Leviticus. Translated by H. Freedman and Maurice Simon. London: Soncino Press, 1939.
Sefer Yetzirah. 10th century. In, e.g., Aryeh Kaplan. Sefer Yetzirah: The Book of Creation; In Theory and Practice. Boston: Weiser Books, 1997.
Exodus Rabbah 1:2, 14, 20, 32; 2:4; 3:13; 5:1; 9:11; 10:1–2; 12:3; 14:2; 15:7, 22, 30; 21:6, 8; 23:4; 25:6; 29:6–8; 30:3, 13; 31:17; 32:1–2; 33:4; 34:2; 35:1; 41:2; 48:2; 50:1; 52:5. 10th century. In, e.g., Midrash Rabbah: Exodus. Translated by S. M. Lehrman. London: Soncino Press, 1939.
Lamentations Rabbah: prologue 4, 24, 26; 1:1, 37, 43, 52; 2:10; 3:13; 5:22. 10th century. In, e.g., Midrash Rabbah: Deuteronomy/Lamentations. Translated by A. Cohen, volume 7, pages 6–7, 38, 44–45, 69, 113, 124, 139, 173, 206, 244. London: Soncino Press, 1939.

Solomon ibn Gabirol. A Crown for the King, 4:50–51; 6:63; 10:107–115; 12:124–125 24:290; 25:294–295; 31:371–378. Spain, 11th century. Translated by David R. Slavitt, pages 8–11, 14–17, 38–41. New York: Oxford University Press, 1998.
Numbers Rabbah 1:1; 2:21; 3:8; 4:8; 5:3–4; 7:5, 7; 8:4; 9:7, 18, 24; 10:1–2, 4–5, 8; 11:2–3; 12:4, 6, 13; 13:2–3, 5–6, 12, 14; 14:6, 9, 12; 15:7, 9; 16:24; 17:1; 18:7, 22; 19:2–3, 11, 23; 20:2, 6; 21:18; 23:13. 12th century. In, e.g., Midrash Rabbah: Numbers. Translated by Judah J. Slotki. London: Soncino Press, 1939.

Beowulf. Lines 99–114, 1255–1268. England, 8th–11th Centuries. In, e.g., Beowulf: A New Verse Translation. Translated by Seamus Heaney, pages 9, 89. New York: Farrar, Straus and Giroux, 2000. (Cain).
Rashi. Commentary. Genesis 1–6. Troyes, France, late 11th century. In, e.g., Rashi. The Torah: With Rashi's Commentary Translated, Annotated, and Elucidated. Translated and annotated by Yisrael Isser Zvi Herczeg, volume 1, pages 1–63. Brooklyn: Mesorah Publications, 1995.
Rashbam. Commentary on the Torah. Troyes, early 12th century. In, e.g., Rabbi Samuel Ben Meir's Commentary on Genesis: An Annotated Translation. Translated by Martin I. Lockshin, pages 28–57. Lewiston, New York: The Edwin Mellen Press, 1989.
Judah Halevi. Kuzari. 2:14, 20; 3:1, 73; 4:3, 25; 5:10. Toledo, Spain, 1130–1140. In, e.g., Jehuda Halevi. Kuzari: An Argument for the Faith of Israel. Introduction by Henry Slonimsky, pages 89–91, 94, 135, 193, 195, 209, 229, 235, 254–256. New York: Schocken, 1964.
Abraham ibn Ezra. Commentary on the Torah. Mid-12th century. In, e.g., Ibn Ezra's Commentary on the Pentateuch: Genesis (Bereshit). Translated and annotated by H. Norman Strickman and Arthur M. Silver, pages 21–98. New York: Menorah Publishing Company, 1988.
Hezekiah ben Manoah. Hizkuni. France, circa 1240. In, e.g., Chizkiyahu ben Manoach. Chizkuni: Torah Commentary. Translated and annotated by Eliyahu Munk, volume 1, pages 1–65. Jerusalem: Ktav Publishers, 2013.
Midrash ha-Ne'lam (The Midrash of the Concealed). Spain, 13th century. In Zohar Chadash, pages 2d–20b. Salonika, 1597. In, e.g., The Zohar: Pritzker Edition, translation and commentary by Nathan Wolski, volume 10, pages 3–222. Stanford, California: Stanford University Press, 2016.
Nachmanides. Commentary on the Torah. Jerusalem, circa 1270. In, e.g., Ramban (Nachmanides): Commentary on the Torah: Genesis. Translated by Charles B. Chavel, volume 1, pages 17–104. New York: Shilo Publishing House, 1971.
Zohar, volume 1, pages 1a, 3b, 11b, 15a–59a, 59b, 60b, 70b–71a, 73a–b, 76a, 79b–80a, 82b, 85a, 95b, 97a–b, 102b, 103b, 105b, 115a, 124a, 128b, 130b–131a, 138a–b, 141b, 143a–b, 144b, 148b, 154b–155a, 158a, 162b–163a, 165a–b, 166b, 171a, 177a, 179a–b, 184a, 194a, 199b, 208a, 216a, 224a, 227b, 232a, 240a; volume 2, pages 10a–b, 11b–12a, 15b, 23a, 24b, 27a–b, 28b, 34a, 37a–b, 39a, 51a, 54b–55a, 63b, 68b, 70a, 75a, 79a, 85b, 88a, 90a, 94b, 99b, 103a, 113b, 127b, 147b, 149b, 167a–168a, 171a, 172a, 174b–175a, 184a, 192b, 201a, 207b, 210b–211b, 219b, 220b, 222b, 224b, 226a, 229b–230a, 231a–b, 234b–235a; volume 3, pages 7a, 9b, 19a–b, 24b, 35b, 39b–40a, 44b, 46b, 48a–b, 58a, 61b, 83b, 93a, 107a, 117a, 148a, 189a, 261b, 298a. Spain, late 13th century. In, e.g., The Zohar. Translated by Harry Sperling and Maurice Simon. 5 volumes. London: Soncino Press, 1934.
Bahya ben Asher. Commentary on the Torah. Spain, early 14th century. In, e.g., Midrash Rabbeinu Bachya: Torah Commentary by Rabbi Bachya ben Asher. Translated and annotated by Eliyahu Munk, volume 1, pages 1–163. Jerusalem: Lambda Publishers, 2003.
Nissim of Gerona (The Ran). Derashos HaRan (Discourses of the Ran), discourse 1. Barcelona, Catalonia, 14th century. In, e.g., Yehuda Meir Keilson. Derashos HaRan: Discourses of the Ran, Rabbeinu Nissim ben Reuven of Gerona, Translated, Annotated, and Elucidated. Volume 1, pages 1–109. Brooklyn: Mesorah Publications, 2019.
Isaac ben Moses Arama. Akedat Yizhak (The Binding of Isaac). Late 15th century. In, e.g., Yitzchak Arama. Akeydat Yitzchak: Commentary of Rabbi Yitzchak Arama on the Torah. Translated and condensed by Eliyahu Munk, volume 1, pages 1–63. New York, Lambda Publishers, 2001.

Modern
Isaac Abravanel. Commentary on the Torah. Italy, between 1492–1509. In, e.g., Abarbanel: Selected Commentaries on the Torah: Volume 1: Bereishis/Genesis, translated and annotated by Israel Lazar, pages 13–53. Brooklyn: CreateSpace, 2015. And in, e.g., Abarbanel on the Torah: Selected Themes. Translated by Avner Tomaschoff, pages 11–285. Jerusalem: Jewish Agency for Israel, 2007.
Obadiah ben Jacob Sforno. Commentary on the Torah. Venice, 1567. In, e.g., Sforno: Commentary on the Torah. Translation and explanatory notes by Raphael Pelcovitz, pages 1–39. Brooklyn: Mesorah Publications, 1997.
Moshe Alshich. Commentary on the Torah. Safed, circa 1593. In, e.g., Moshe Alshich. Midrash of Rabbi Moshe Alshich on the Torah. Translated and annotated by Eliyahu Munk, volume 1, pages 1–61. New York, Lambda Publishers, 2000.
Avraham Yehoshua Heschel. Commentaries on the Torah. Cracow, Poland, mid 17th century. Compiled as Chanukat HaTorah. Edited by Chanoch Henoch Erzohn. Piotrkow, Poland, 1900. In Avraham Yehoshua Heschel. Chanukas HaTorah: Mystical Insights of Rav Avraham Yehoshua Heschel on Chumash. Translated by Avraham Peretz Friedman, pages 27–40. Southfield, Michigan: Targum Press/Feldheim Publishers, 2004.

Thomas Hobbes. Leviathan, 2:20; 3:34, 36, 38; 4:44. England, 1651. Reprint edited by C. B. Macpherson, pages 259, 430, 432, 440, 453, 479, 486, 636–637, 645–647. Harmondsworth, England: Penguin Classics, 1982.
John Milton. Paradise Lost. 1667. Reprint, Penguin Classics, 2003.
Baruch Spinoza. Theologico-Political Treatise, chapters 1, 2, 9. Amsterdam, 1670. In, e.g., Baruch Spinoza. Theological-Political Treatise, translated by Samuel Shirley, pages 17, 29, 32, 127. Indianapolis: Hackett Publishing Company, second edition, 2001.
Chaim ibn Attar. Ohr ha-Chaim. Venice, 1742. In Chayim ben Attar. Or Hachayim: Commentary on the Torah. Translated by Eliyahu Munk, volume 1, pages 1–91. Brooklyn: Lambda Publishers, 1999.

Moses Mendelssohn. Sefer Netivot Hashalom (The "Bi’ur," The Explanation). Berlin, 1780–1783. In Moses Mendelssohn: Writings on Judaism, Christianity, and the Bible. Edited Michah Gottlieb, pages 208–211. Waltham, Massachusetts: Brandeis University Press, 2011.
Moses Mendelssohn.Jerusalem, § 1. Berlin, 1783. In Jerusalem: Or on Religious Power and Judaism. Translated by Allan Arkush; introduction and commentary by Alexander Altmann, page 70. Hanover, New Hampshire: Brandeis University Press, 1983.
Lord Byron. Cain. 1821.
Doctrine and Covenants 27:11; 107:54. Missouri, 1835.
Jones Very. Enoch. 1838. In Harold Bloom. American Religious Poems, page 95. Library of America, 2006.

Emily Dickinson. Poem 1 (Awake ye muses nine, sing me a strain divine,). 1850. Poem 428 (Taking up the fair Ideal,). Circa 1862. Poem 503 (Better—than Music! For I—who heard it —). Circa 1862. Poem 724 (It's easy to invent a Life —). Circa 1863. Poem 1069 (Paradise is of the option.). Circa 1866. Poem 1119 (Paradise is that old mansion). Circa 1868. Poem 1195 (What we see we know somewhat). Circa 1871. Poem 1545 (The Bible is an antique Volume —). Circa 1882. Poem 1657 (Eden is that old-fashioned House). 19th century. In The Complete Poems of Emily Dickinson. Edited by Thomas H. Johnson, pages 3–4, 205, 244–245, 355, 486, 503, 528–529, 644, 677. New York: Little, Brown & Co., 1960.

Samuel David Luzzatto (Shadal). Commentary on the Torah. Padua, 1871. In, e.g., Samuel David Luzzatto. Torah Commentary. Translated and annotated by Eliyahu Munk, volume 1, pages 1–99. New York: Lambda Publishers, 2012.
William Butler Yeats. Adam's Curse . 1902. In The Collected Poems of W.B. Yeats: Definitive Edition, With the Author's Final Revisions, pages 78–79. New York: Macmillan, 1956.

Mark Twain. Extracts from Adam's Diary. New York: Harper and Brothers, 1904. In, e.g., The Diaries of Adam and Eve. Amherst, New York: Prometheus Books, 2000.
Mark Twain. Eve's Diary. New York: Harper and Brothers, 1906. In, e.g., The Diaries of Adam and Eve. Amherst, New York: Prometheus Books, 2000.
Yehudah Aryeh Leib Alter. Sefat Emet. Góra Kalwaria (Ger), Poland, before 1906. Excerpted in The Language of Truth: The Torah Commentary of Sefat Emet. Translated and interpreted by Arthur Green, pages 3–11. Philadelphia: Jewish Publication Society, 1998. Reprinted 2012.

Hermann Cohen. Religion of Reason: Out of the Sources of Judaism. Translated with an introduction by Simon Kaplan; introductory essays by Leo Strauss, pages 85–86, 119, 130, 156, 181, 215. New York: Ungar, 1972. Reprinted Atlanta: Scholars Press, 1995. Originally published as Religion der Vernunft aus den Quellen des Judentums. Leipzig: Gustav Fock, 1919.
Abraham Isaac Kook. The Lights of Penitence, 6:7, 11:4. 1925. The Lights of Holiness. Early 20th century. In Abraham Isaac Kook: the Lights of Penitence, the Moral Principles, Lights of Holiness, Essays, Letters, and Poems. Translated by Ben Zion Bokser, pages 59–60, 81, 195. Mahwah, N.J.: Paulist Press 1978.
Alexander Alan Steinbach. Sabbath Queen: Fifty-four Bible Talks to the Young Based on Each Portion of the Pentateuch, pages 1–4. New York: Behrman's Jewish Book House, 1936.
Thornton Wilder. The Skin of Our Teeth. 1942. Reprinted Harper Perennial Modern Classics, 2003.
Thomas Mann. Joseph and His Brothers. Translated by John E. Woods, pages 3, 10–11, 19–20, 24–36, 56, 68–69, 76, 85–86, 88, 104–105, 107, 154, 160, 171, 323–324, 332, 347–350, 354, 393, 403, 441–442, 446–449, 457, 459, 463, 487, 524, 530, 726–727, 806, 915, 917, 925, 978. New York: Alfred A. Knopf, 2005. Originally published as Joseph und seine Brüder. Stockholm: Bermann-Fischer Verlag, 1943.
The Sabbath Anthology. Edited by Abraham E. Millgram. Philadelphia: The Jewish Publication Society, 1944; reprinted 2018..

John Steinbeck. East of Eden. Viking Adult, 1952.
Erich Auerbach. Mimesis: The Representation of Reality in Western Literature. Translated by Willard R. Trask, pages 143–173. Princeton, N.J.: Princeton Univ. Press, 1953.
Isaac Schapera. "The Sin of Cain." Journal of the Royal Anthropological Institute, volume 85 (1955): pages 33–43. In Anthropological Approaches to the Old Testament. Edited by Bernhard Lang, pages 26–42. Philadelphia: Fortress Press, 1985.
George W. Buchanan. "The Old Testament Meaning of the Knowledge of Good and Evil." Journal of Biblical Literature, volume 75 (number 2) (1956): pages 114–120.
Leo Strauss. "On the Interpretation of Genesis." L'Homme: Revue française d'anthropologie, volume 21 (number 1) (January–March 1981): pages 5–20. In Jewish Philosophy and the Crisis of Modernity: Essays and Lectures in Modern Jewish Thought. Edited by Kenneth Hart Green, pages 359–376. Albany, New York: State University of New York Press, 1997. (text of a 1957 University of Chicago lecture focusing on ).
Morris Adler. The World of the Talmud, pages 25–26, 28, 76. B'nai B'rith Hillel Foundations, 1958. Reprinted Kessinger Publishing, 2007.
Dietrich Bonhoeffer. Creation and Fall: A Theological Interpretation of Genesis 1–3. Translated by J.C. Fletcher. London: SCM, 1959. Reprinted edited by Douglas Stephen Bax. Fortress Press, 1997.
Giorgio R. Castellino. "Genesis IV 7." Vetus Testamentum, volume 10 (number 1) (1960): pages 442–445.
Brevard S. Childs. "Eden, Garden of" and "Eve." In The Interpreter's Dictionary of the Bible: An Illustrated Encyclopedia, volume 2, pages 22–23 and 181–182. Nashville: Abingdon Press, 1962.
Brevard S. Childs. "Tree of Knowledge, Tree of Life." In The Interpreter's Dictionary of the Bible: An Illustrated Encyclopedia, volume 4, pages 695–697. Nashville: Abingdon Press, 1962.
Walther Eichrodt. "In the Beginning: A Contribution to the Interpretation of the First Word in the Bible." In Israel's Prophetic Heritage: Essays in Honor of James Muilenburg, pages 1–10. Edited by Bernhard W. Anderson and Walter Harrelson. London: SCM Press, 1962.
Islwyn Blythin, A. Feuillet, P.P. Saydon, and H. Cazelles. "A Note on Genesis 1:2." Vetus Testamentum, volume 12 (number 1) (1962): pages 120–121.
E.A. Speiser. Genesis: Introduction, Translation, and Notes, pages 1–51. New York: Anchor Bible, 1964.
Frederick Buechner. The Magnificent Defeat, pages 19–26. Seabury Press, 1966. Reprinted San Francisco: Harper & Row, 1985.
James Barr. "The Image of God in the Book of Genesis—A Study of Terminology". Bulletin of the John Rylands Library, volume 51 (number 1) (1968): pages 11–26.

Martin Buber. On the Bible: Eighteen studies, pages 14–21. New York: Schocken Books, 1968.
David J. A. Clines. "The Image of God in Man". Tyndale Bulletin, volume 19 (1968): pages 53–103.
W. Malcolm Clark. "A Legal Background to the Yahwist's Use of ‘Good and Evil' in Genesis 2–3." Journal of Biblical Literature, volume 88 (number 3) (1969): pages 266–278.
John A. Bailey. "Initiation and the Primal Woman in Gilgamesh and Genesis 2–3". Journal of Biblical Literature, volume 89 (number 2) (1970): pages 137–150.
Walter Brueggemann. "Of the Same Flesh and Bone (Gn 2:23a)." Catholic Biblical Quarterly, volume 32 (number 4) (1970): pages 532–542.
Roland de Vaux. "The Revelation of the Divine Name YHVH." In Proclamation and Presence: Old Testament Essays in Honour of Gwynne Henton Davies. Edited by John I. Durham and J. Roy Porter, pages 48–75. London: SCM Press, 1970.
A.N. Barnard. "Was Noah a Righteous Man? Studies in Texts: Genesis 6:8". Theology, volume 74 (1971): pages 311–314.
Thomas C. Hartman. "Some Thoughts on the Sumerian King List and Genesis 5 and 11B". Journal of Biblical Literature, volume 91 (number 1) (March 1972): pages 25–32.
Greg J. Carlson. "The Two Creation Accounts in Schematic Contrast." Bible Today, volume 66 (1973): pages 1192–1194.
Umberto Cassuto. "The Episode of the Sons of God and the Daughters of Men (Genesis 6:1–4)." In Biblical and Oriental Studies. Translated by Israel Abrahams, volume 1, pages 17–28. Jerusalem: Magnes Press, 1973.
David J. A. Clines. "The Tree of Knowledge and the Law of Yahweh (Psalm 19)". Vetus Testamentum, volume 24 (number 1) (1974): pages 8–14.
Literary Interpretations of Biblical Narratives. Edited by Kenneth R.R. Gros Louis, with James S. Ackerman & Thayer S. Warshaw, pages 41–58. Nashville: Abingdon Press, 1974.
Luis Alonso-Schökel. "Sapiential and Covenant Themes in Genesis 2–3." In Studies in Ancient Israelite Wisdom. Edited by James L. Crenshaw and Harry M. Orlinsky, pages 468–480. New York: Ktav, 1976.
Elie Wiesel. "Adam, or the Mystery of Being" and "Cain and Abel: the First Genocide." In Messengers of God: Biblical Portraits & Legends, pages 3–68. New York: Random House, 1976.
Bernhard W. Anderson. "A Stylistic Study of the Priestly Creation Story." In Canon and Authority: Essays in Old Testament Religion and Authority. Edited by George W. Coats and Burke O. Long, pages 148–162. Philadelphia: Fortress, 1977. *Tikva Frymer-Kensky. "The Atrahasis Epic and Its Significance for Our Understanding of Genesis 1–9". Biblical Archaeologist, volume 40 (number 4) (1977): pages 147–155.
Gerhard Larsson. "Chronological Parallels Between the Creation and the Flood." Vetus Testamentum, volume 27 (number 4) (1977): pages 490–492.
Thomas E. Boomershine. "Structure and Narrative Rhetoric in Genesis 2–3." Society of Biblical Literature Abstracts and Seminar Papers, volume 1 (1978): pages 31–49.
Gerhard F. Hasel. "The Genealogies of Gen 5 and 11 and Their Alleged Babylonian Background". Andrews University Seminary Studies, volume 6 (1978): pages 361–374.
Phyllis Trible. "A Love Story Gone Awry." In God and the Rhetoric of Sexuality, pages 72–143. Philadelphia: Fortress Press, 1978. (Genesis 2–3).
David J. A. Clines. "The Significance of the ‘Sons of God' Episode (Genesis 6:1–4) in the Context of the ‘Primeval History' (Genesis 1–11)." Journal for the Study of the Old Testament, volume 13 (1979): pages 33–46.
John Baker. "The Myth of Man's ‘Fall'—A Reappraisal". Expository Times, volume 92 (1980/81): pages 235–237.
Derek R.G. Beattie. "What Is Genesis 2–3 About?" Expository Times, volume 92 (number 1) (1980/81): pages 8–10.
Mayer I. Gruber. "Was Cain Angry or Depressed?" Biblical Archaeology Review, volume 6 (number 6) (November/December 1980).
Phyllis A. Bird. "‘Male and Female He Created Them': Gen. 1:27b in the Context of the Priestly Account of Creation". Harvard Theological Review, volume 74 (number 2) (1981): pages 129–159.
Nehama Leibowitz. Studies in Bereshit (Genesis), pages 1–58. Jerusalem: The World Zionist Organization, 1981. Reprinted as New Studies in the Weekly Parasha. Lambda Publishers, 2010.
Walter Brueggemann. Genesis: Interpretation: A Bible Commentary for Teaching and Preaching, pages 11–88. Atlanta: John Knox Press, 1982.
Harry M. Orlinsky. "Enigmatic Bible Passages: The Plain Meaning of Genesis 1:1–3." Biblical Archaeologist, volume 46 (1983).
Henri Blocher. In the Beginning: The Opening Chapters of Genesis. Translated by David G. Preston. Downers Grove, Illinois: InterVarsity Press, 1984.
Michael Blumenthal. "Light, at Thirty-Two". In Days We Would Rather Know. Viking, 1984.
Creation in the Old Testament. Edited by Bernhard W. Anderson. Philadelphia: Fortress Press, 1984.
Isaac M. Kikawada and Arthur Quinn, Before Abraham Was: The Unity of Genesis 1–11. Nashville: Abingdon, 1985.
David T. Bryan. "A Reevaluation of Gen 4 and 5 in the Light of Recent Studies in Genealogical Fluidity," Zeitschrift für die Alttestamentliche Wissenschaft, volume 99 (1987): pages 180–188.
Ronald S. Hendel. "When the Sons of God Cavorted with the Daughters of Men." Bible Review, volume 3 (number 2) (Summer 1987).
Bernard Batto. "When God Sleeps." Bible Review, volume 3 (number 4) (Winter 1987).
Victor Hurowitz. "When Did God Finish Creation?" Bible Review, volume 3 (number 4) (Winter 1987).
Pinchas H. Peli. Torah Today: A Renewed Encounter with Scripture, pages 3–6. Washington, D.C.: B'nai B'rith Books, 1987.
Pamela J. Milne. "Eve and Adam: Is a Feminist Reading Possible?" Bible Review, volume 4 (number 3) (June 1988).
Gunnlaugur A. Jonsson. The Image of God: Genesis 1:26–28 in a Century of Old Testament Research. Coronet Books, 1988. (Coniectanea Biblica Old Testament Series number 26.)
Jon D. Levenson. Creation and the Persistence of Evil: The Jewish Drama of Divine Omnipotence. San Francisco: Harper & Row, 1988.
Marc Gellman. Does God Have a Big Toe? Stories About Stories in the Bible, pages 1–17, 23–25. New York: HarperCollins, 1989.
Nahum M. Sarna. The JPS Torah Commentary: Genesis: The Traditional Hebrew Text with the New JPS Translation, pages 3–47, 375–376. Philadelphia: Jewish Publication Society, 1989.
Creation in the Biblical Traditions. Edited by Richard J. Clifford and John J. Collins. Washington, D.C.: Catholic Biblical Association of America, 1992.
Adrien Janis Bledstein. "Was Eve Cursed? (Or Did a Woman Write Genesis?)" Bible Review, volume 9 (number 1) (February 1993).
Aaron Wildavsky. Assimilation versus Separation: Joseph the Administrator and the Politics of Religion in Biblical Israel, page 5. New Brunswick, New Jersey: Transaction Publishers, 1993.
Jacob Milgrom. "Sex and Wisdom: What the Garden of Eden Story Is Saying: There is a plain, unambiguous meaning to the story: It is about sexual awareness and the creativity of which that is a part." Bible Review, volume 10 (number 6) (December 1994).
Judith S. Antonelli. "Chavah: Mother of All Life." In In the Image of God: A Feminist Commentary on the Torah, pages 3–18. Northvale, New Jersey: Jason Aronson, 1995.
Naomi H. Rosenblatt and Joshua Horwitz. Wrestling With Angels: What Genesis Teaches Us About Our Spiritual Identity, Sexuality, and Personal Relationships, pages 5–64. Delacorte Press, 1995.
Phyllis Trible. "Eve and Miriam: From the Margins to the Center." In Feminist Approaches to the Bible: Symposium at the Smithsonian Institution September 24, 1994. Biblical Archaeology Society, 1995.
Avivah Gottlieb Zornberg. The Beginning of Desire: Reflections on Genesis, pages 3–36. New York: Image Books/Doubelday, 1995.
Ellen Frankel. The Five Books of Miriam: A Woman's Commentary on the Torah, pages 3–10. New York: G. P. Putnam's Sons, 1996.
Marc Gellman. God's Mailbox: More Stories About Stories in the Bible, pages 3–23. New York: Morrow Junior Books, 1996.
Kenneth Mathews. The New American Commentary: Genesis 1–11:26. Nashville, Tennessee: Broadman and Holman, 1996.

W. Gunther Plaut. The Haftarah Commentary, pages 1–12. New York: UAHC Press, 1996.
Gary A. Rendsburg. "Biblical Literature as Politics: The Case of Genesis". In Religion and Politics in the Ancient Near East. Edited by Adele Berlin, pages 47, 61–65. Bethesda, Maryland: University Press of Maryland, 1996.
Sorel Goldberg Loeb and Barbara Binder Kadden. Teaching Torah: A Treasury of Insights and Activities, pages 3–10. Denver: A.R.E. Publishing, 1997.
Bill Dauster. "Disclosure." 1999. (short story retelling ).
Susan Freeman. Teaching Jewish Virtues: Sacred Sources and Arts Activities, pages 8–25, 39–54, 119–148, 211–240. Springfield, New Jersey: A.R.E. Publishing, 1999.

Adin Steinsaltz. Simple Words: Thinking About What Really Matters in Life, pages 16, 25, 39, 46, 105–107. New York: Simon & Schuster, 1999.
Lori Forman. "The Told Story of Eve." In The Women's Torah Commentary: New Insights from Women Rabbis on the 54 Weekly Torah Portions. Edited by Elyse Goldstein, pages 47–52. Woodstock, Vermont: Jewish Lights Publishing, 2000.
John S. Kselman. "Genesis." In The HarperCollins Bible Commentary. Edited by James L. Mays, pages 85–88. New York: HarperCollins Publishers, revised edition, 2000.
Simi Peters. "Na’aseh Adam: Should We Make Adam? A Midrashic Reading of Genesis 1:26." In Torah of the Mothers: Contemporary Jewish Women Read Classical Jewish Texts. Edited by Ora Wiskind Elper and Susan Handelman, pages 291–306. New York and Jerusalem: Urim Publications, 2000.

Lawrence E. Stager. "Jerusalem as Eden." Biblical Archaeology Review, volume 26 (number 3) (May/June 2000): pages 36–47, 66.
Jennifer Michael Hecht. "History". In The Next Ancient World, page 20. Dorset, Vermont: Tupelo Press, 2001.
Pamela Tamarkin Reis. "Genesis as Rashomon: The Creation as Told by God and Man." Bible Review, volume 17 (number 3) (June 2001): pages 26–33, 55.
Lainie Blum Cogan and Judy Weiss. Teaching Haftarah: Background, Insights, and Strategies, pages 275–285. Denver: A.R.E. Publishing, 2002.
Michael Fishbane. The JPS Bible Commentary: Haftarot, pages 3–11. Philadelphia: Jewish Publication Society, 2002.
James Tate. "Just to Feel Human". In Memoir of the Hawk. The Ecco Press, 2002.
Rodger Kamenetz. "Genesis 1:1", "Adam, Earthling," and "Adam, Golem." In The Lowercase Jew, pages 33–37. Evanston, Illinois: Triquarterly Books/Northwestern University Press, 2003.
Alan Lew. This Is Real and You Are Completely Unprepared: The Days of Awe as a Journey of Transformation, pages 118, 121. Boston: Little, Brown and Co., 2003.
Joseph Telushkin. The Ten Commandments of Character: Essential Advice for Living an Honorable, Ethical, Honest Life, pages 30–32, 214–217, 292–295. New York: Bell Tower, 2003.
Robert Alter. The Five Books of Moses: A Translation with Commentary, pages xxv, xxxii–xxxiii, xxxv–xxxvi, xli, 17–40. New York: W.W. Norton & Co., 2004.
Jon D. Levenson. "Genesis." In The Jewish Study Bible. Edited by Adele Berlin and Marc Zvi Brettler, pages 12–21. New York: Oxford University Press, 2004.
Anthony Hecht. Naming the Animals. In Collected Later Poems, page 64. New York: Knopf, 2005.
David Maine. Fallen. St. Martin's Press, 2005.
Kenneth Mathews. The New American Commentary: Genesis 11:27–50:26. Nashville, Tennessee: Broadman and Holman, 2005.
J. Richard Middleton. The Liberating Image: The Imago Dei in Genesis 1. Grand Rapids: Brazos Press, 2005.
W. Gunther Plaut. The Torah: A Modern Commentary: Revised Edition. Revised edition edited by David E.S. Stern, pages 17–55. New York: Union for Reform Judaism, 2006.
R.W.L. Moberly. "The Mark of Cain—Revealed at Last?" Harvard Theological Review, volume 100 (number 1) (January 2007): pages 11–28.
Suzanne A. Brody. "Etz Chaim" and "Eve's Lament." In Dancing in the White Spaces: The Yearly Torah Cycle and More Poems, pages 17, 61–62. Shelbyville, Kentucky: Wasteland Press, 2007.
Shai Cherry. "The Creation of Humanity" and "The Sons of Adam and Eve." In Torah Through Time: Understanding Bible Commentary, from the Rabbinic Period to Modern Times, pages 40–100. Philadelphia: The Jewish Publication Society, 2007.
Carol M. Kaminski. “Beautiful Women or 'False Judgment'? Interpreting Genesis 6.2 in the Context of the Primaeval History.” Journal for the Study of the Old Testament, volume 32, number 4 (June 2008): pages 457–73.
James L. Kugel. How To Read the Bible: A Guide to Scripture, Then and Now, pages 29, 47–73, 86, 108–09, 301, 305, 345, 649. New York: Free Press, 2007.
The Torah: A Women's Commentary. Edited by Tamara Cohn Eskenazi and Andrea L. Weiss, pages 3–34. New York: URJ Press, 2008.
James A. Diamond. "Nachmanides and Rashi on the One Flesh of Conjugal Union: Lovemaking vs. Duty." Harvard Theological Review, volume 102 (number 2) (April 2009): pages 193–224.
Elissa Elliott. Eve: A Novel of the First Woman. New York: Delacorte Press, 2009. *Jonathan Goldstein. "Adam and Eve" and "Cain and Abel." In Ladies and Gentlemen, the Bible!, pages 13–43. New York: Riverhead Books, 2009.
Reuven Hammer. Entering Torah: Prefaces to the Weekly Torah Portion, pages 5–10. New York: Gefen Publishing House, 2009.
John H. Walton. The Lost World of Genesis One: Ancient Cosmology and the Origins Debate. Downers Grove, Illinois: IVP Academic, 2009.

Margaret Moers Wenig. "Male and Female God Created Them: Parashat Bereshit (Genesis 1:1–6:8)." In Torah Queeries: Weekly Commentaries on the Hebrew Bible. Edited by Gregg Drinkwater, Joshua Lesser, and David Shneer; foreword by Judith Plaskow, pages 11–18. New York: New York University Press, 2009.
Jonathan Sacks. Covenant & Conversation: A Weekly Reading of the Jewish Bible: Genesis: The Book of Beginnings, pages 13–40. New Milford, Connecticut: Maggid Books, 2009.

Ellen van Wolde. "Why the Verb ‭אדב‬ Does Not Mean 'To Create' in Genesis 1.1–2.4a". Journal for the Study of the Old Testament, volume 34, number 1 (September 2009): pages 3–23.

Mark S. Smith. The Priestly Vision of Genesis 1. Minneapolis: Fortress Press, 2010.
Seth D. Postell. Adam as Israel: Genesis 1–3 as the Introduction to the Torah and Tanakh. Eugene, Oregon: Wipf and Stock Publishers, 2011.
José Saramago. Cain. Translated by Margaret Jull Costa. Houghton Mifflin Harcourt, 2011.
William G. Dever. The Lives of Ordinary People in Ancient Israel: When Archaeology and the Bible Intersect, page 73. Grand Rapids, Michigan: William B. Eerdmans Publishing Company, 2012.

Shmuel Herzfeld. "Finding Light." In Fifty-Four Pick Up: Fifteen-Minute Inspirational Torah Lessons, pages 3–6. Jerusalem: Gefen Publishing House, 2012.
Jim Holt. Why Does the World Exist? An Existential Detective Story. New York: Liveright Publishing, 2012.
John Byron. "Did Cain Get Away with Murder?" Biblical Archaeology Review, volume 40 (number 3) (May/June 2014): pages 24, 68.
Zev Farber. "If the Sun Is Created on Day 4, What Is the Light on Day 1?" TheTorah (2014).
Jonathan Sacks. Lessons in Leadership: A Weekly Reading of the Jewish Bible, pages 3–6. New Milford, Connecticut: Maggid Books, 2015.
 John H. Walton and N.T. Wright. The Lost World of Adam and Eve: Genesis 2-3 and the Human Origins Debate. Downers Grove, Illinois: IVP Academic, 2015.
Jonathan Sacks. Essays on Ethics: A Weekly Reading of the Jewish Bible, pages 3–8. New Milford, Connecticut: Maggid Books, 2016
Annette Schellenberg. "'And God Separated the Light from the Darkness' (Gen 1:4)—On the Role of Borders in the Priestly Texts of the Pentateuch." In Borders: Terminologies, Ideologies, and Performances, edited by Annette Weissenrieder, pages 23–41. Tübingen: Mohr Siebeck, 2016.
Kenneth Seeskin. Thinking about the Torah: A Philosopher Reads the Bible, pages 15–50. Philadelphia: The Jewish Publication Society, 2016.
Shai Held. The Heart of Torah, Volume 1: Essays on the Weekly Torah Portion: Genesis and Exodus, pages 3–11. Philadelphia: Jewish Publication Society, 2017.
Steven Levy and Sarah Levy. The JPS Rashi Discussion Torah Commentary, pages 3–5. Philadelphia: Jewish Publication Society, 2017.
Jeffrey K. Salkin. The JPS B'nai Mitzvah Torah Commentary, pages 3–7. Philadelphia: Jewish Publication Society, 2017.
Javier Alonso López. "Origins of Paradise: The Garden of Eden." National Geographic History, volume 4, number 1 (March/April 2018): pages 16–27.
Julia Rhyder. "Sabbath and Sanctuary Cult in the Holiness Legislation: A Reassessment". Journal of Biblical Literature, volume 138, number 4 (2019): pages 721–740.

External links

Texts
Masoretic text and 1917 JPS translation
Hear the parashah chanted 
Hear the parashah read in Hebrew

Adam and Eve
 
Weekly Torah readings from Genesis
Cain and Abel
Enoch (ancestor of Noah)
Sukkot
Weekly Torah readings in Tishrei